= Navarrese Company =

Medieval mercenary company

The Navarrese Company (Spanish: Compañía navarra; Basque: Nafarroako konpainia) was a company of mercenaries, mostly from Navarre and Gascony that fought in Albania and Greece during the late 14th and early 15th centuries, in the twilight of Frankish power in the dwindling remnant of the Latin Empire. "Navarrese Company" is a modern informal term for the soldiers and is thus somewhat inaccurate.

== Origins ==
The first Navarrese Company was formed to fight for King Charles II of Navarre against King Charles V of France. In 1366, after peace had been made, the mercenaries were organised into a coherent company of soldiers under Louis, Count of Beaumont-le-Roger in his own right and Duke of Durazzo in right of his wife, Joanna. Louis was a brother of Charles of Navarre, who supported his endeavour to recapture lost Durazzo and the regnum Albaniae. Charles V of France, likewise, aided him with 50,000 ducats.

In 1372, the Navarrese ranks began to swell through the recruiting techniques of Enguerrand VII de Coucy, who was hired to form a force of 500 lances and 500 mounted archers, mostly from Gascony. Though the soldiers were recruited for service in Albania, they were first organised in Naples. In 1375 and 1376, many men from Navarre began enlisting and travelled directly to Albania to join their countrymen. The enrollment lists for those years have been preserved in Pamplona and reveal the important presence of many engineers. The total number of men who left Tortosa between February 1375 and June 1376 was in the thousands. They were paid 30 gold Aragonese florins a month.

In 1376, Louis and the Navarrese captured Durazzo during the Durrës Expedition and so re-established the regnum Albaniae. Louis died that same year, which left the Navarrese unemployed. They put themselves under at the command of King Peter IV of Aragon early in 1377 and were formed as four companies, commanded by four captains: the Gascon Mahiot of Coquerel and Pedro de la Saga and the Navarrese Juan de Urtubia and Guarro.

Coat of arms of the first dynasty of the Principality of Achaea

== Morea ==
The Navarrese entered Morea in the spring or early summer of 1378, some coming at the invitation of Gaucher of La Bastide, the Hospitaller prior of Toulouse and commandant in the Principality of Achaea and others probably at the bequest of Nerio I Acciaioli. Gaucher hired Mahiot and the remnant of the company for eight months during the captivity of Grand Master Juan Fernández de Heredia. Meanwhile, Juan de Urtubia was in Corinth with a following of more than 100 soldiers.

After leaving the service of the Hospital, the Company took up with James of Baux, the latest claimant to Achaea. Indeed, Mahiot and the Navarrese governed the entire Morea under the auspices of James of Baux. In 1379, Urtubia with a large force invaded Boeotia and sacked Thebes, then under the control of the Catalan Company, with the assistance of the archbishop of the city, Simon Atumano. At that point, the Navarrese Company took on a different character. Some men who had served under Urtubia are with Mahiot in the Morea again. The Company organised itself as a viceregal power in Achaea under three captains: Mahiot, Pedro de San Superano, and Berard de Varvassa. For the next two years, the Navarrese governed Achaea and often hired itself out to the Hospital.

When James of Baux succeeded to the imperial title of Constantinople, the Navarrese leaders received imperial titles for upholding his rights in Achaea. When James died in 1383, the Navarrese were the reigning power in Frankish Greece, and it fell to them the responsibility of reorganising the state and securing a new prince. While the Navarrese refused to recognise the heirs of James without proof, which was too costly to provide, they remained in power in Achaea and were licensed by the barons of the realm to negotiate the treaty of 26 July 1387 with the Republic of Venice. In 1386, Pedro de San Superano succeeded Mahiot as the Company's leader.

In 1396, King Ladislaus of Naples sold the rights to the Principality of Achaea to Pedro de San Superano, the now leader of the Navarrese Company, ending the principality's formal vassalage to the Angevins. Ultimately, Pedro did not have the funds to pay Ladislaus, and through winning a family inheritance dispute that followed Peter's death in November 1402, Centurione II Zaccaria, a relative of Pedro (nephew of his wife) paid the owed sum, and became the new Prince of Achaea as per the original terms of the sale.

== Sources ==
- Setton, Kenneth M. (1975). "The Catalans in Greece, 1311–1388". In Setton, Kenneth M.; Hazard, Harry W. (eds.). A History of the Crusades, Volume III: The Fourteenth and Fifteenth Centuries. Vol. 3. Madison and London: University of Wisconsin Press. pp. 167–224. ISBN 0-299-06670-3.
- Setton, Kenneth M. (1975). "The Catalans and Florentines in Greece, 1311–1462". In Setton, Kenneth M.; Hazard, Harry W. (eds.). A History of the Crusades, Volume III: The Fourteenth and Fifteenth Centuries. Vol. 3. Madison and London: University of Wisconsin Press. pp. 225–277. ISBN 0-299-06670-3.
- Zečević, Nada (2014) [1968]. The Tocco of the Greek Realm: Nobility, Power and Migration in Latin Greece (14th – 15th Centuries). Makart. ISBN 978-8687115118.
