= Durrës Expedition =

1376 battle between Albanian and French forces in medieval Albania

Durrës Expedition Ekspedita e Durrësit
- Part of Albanian-Anjou Conflict
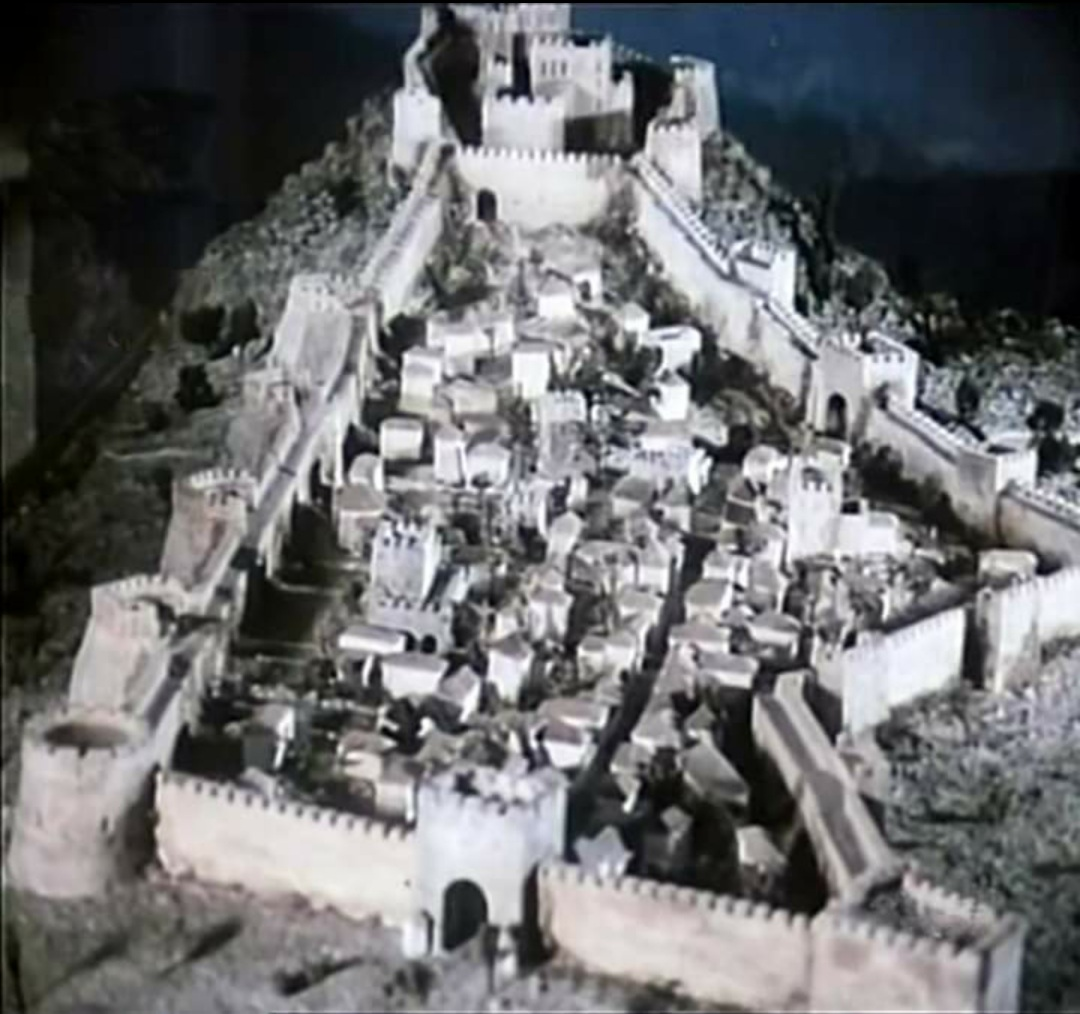
- Model of Durrës Castle during the Middle Ages
Date	1376
Location	Durrës, Principality of Albania 41°19′N 19°27′E
Result	Navarrese victory

Belligerents
Principality of Albania	Navarrese Company; Kingdom of Navarre; Kingdom of France

Commanders and leaders
Karl Thopia	Louis of Évreux; Enguerrand VII de Coucy; Pedro de la Saga; Mahiot de Coquerel; John de Urtubia; Garro

Strength
Unknown	500 lances 500 mounted archers (The largest single recruitment effort, but not the core or majority of the force, for both 500 lances and 500 mounted archers)

Casualties and losses
Unknown	Unknown
- Location within Albania Durrës Expedition (Mediterranean)

The Durrës Expedition (Albanian: Ekspedita e Durrësit) was an invasion of the Principality of Albania—led by Karl Thopia—by the Navarrese Company, under the command of Louis of Évreux. Louis hired the Navarrese Company to support him in reclaiming his newly acquired rights over the city of Durrës and overall the Kingdom of Albania, inherited through his marriage to Joanna, Duchess of Durazzo. While details of the expedition are scarce, Louis succeeded in occupying Durrës and ousting Thopia in 1376. However, he died shortly thereafter, rendering his contract with the Navarrese Company void. The mercenaries relocated to Morea under new leadership, leaving Durrës a contested city until another invasion by Thopia in 1383, which led to the final disestablishment of the Kingdom of Albania.

== Background ==
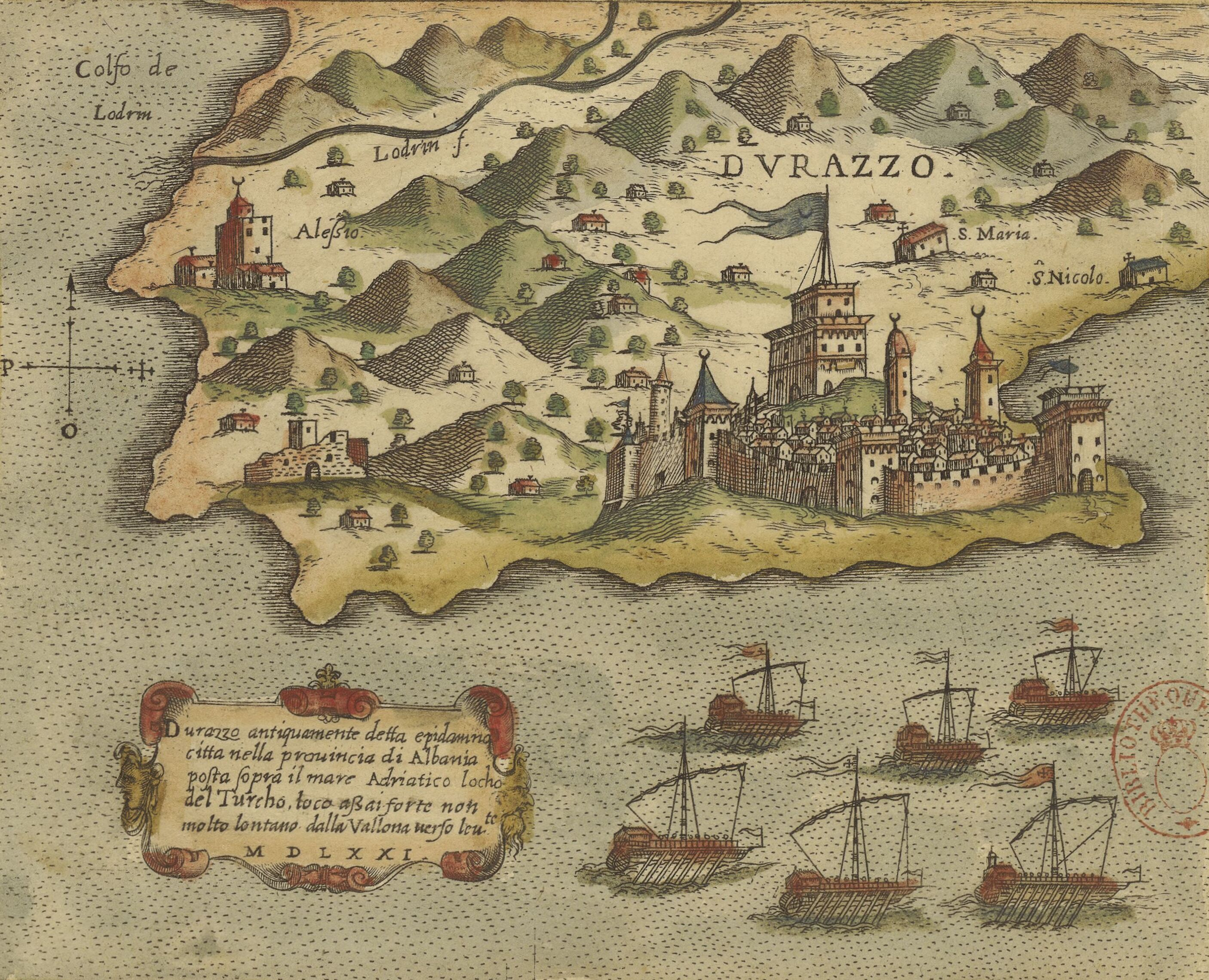
Depiction of Durrës Castle in 1571.

Joanna, Duchess of Durazzo, inherited the rights to the Kingdom of Albania upon the death of her father, Charles, Duke of Durazzo due to being the eldest surviving child, and subsequently ruled as a duchess. In 1365, Louis of Évreux married Joanna and inherited the rights to the Kingdom of Albania, becoming the Duke of Durazzo by right of his wife. Karl Thopia from the Albanian Thopia family conquered and took control of Durrës in 1368 and incorporated it into the Principality of Albania. Durrës had been the last stronghold of the Angevins, who maintained control over the kingdom, until Thopia conquered the city, leading to the disestablishment of the Kingdom of Albania. After this event, Louis made various attempts to expel the intruders from Durrës and Albania as a whole. However, detailed records of these attempts have been lost over time, leaving little documentation of his early efforts.

== Expedition ==
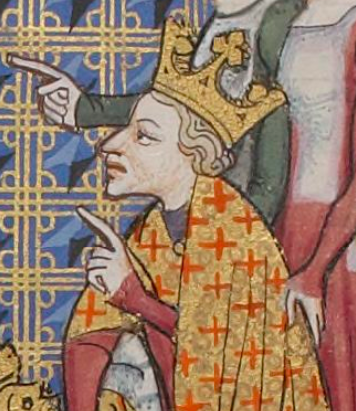
Louis of Évreux's brother Charles II of Navarre, who was King of Navarre.

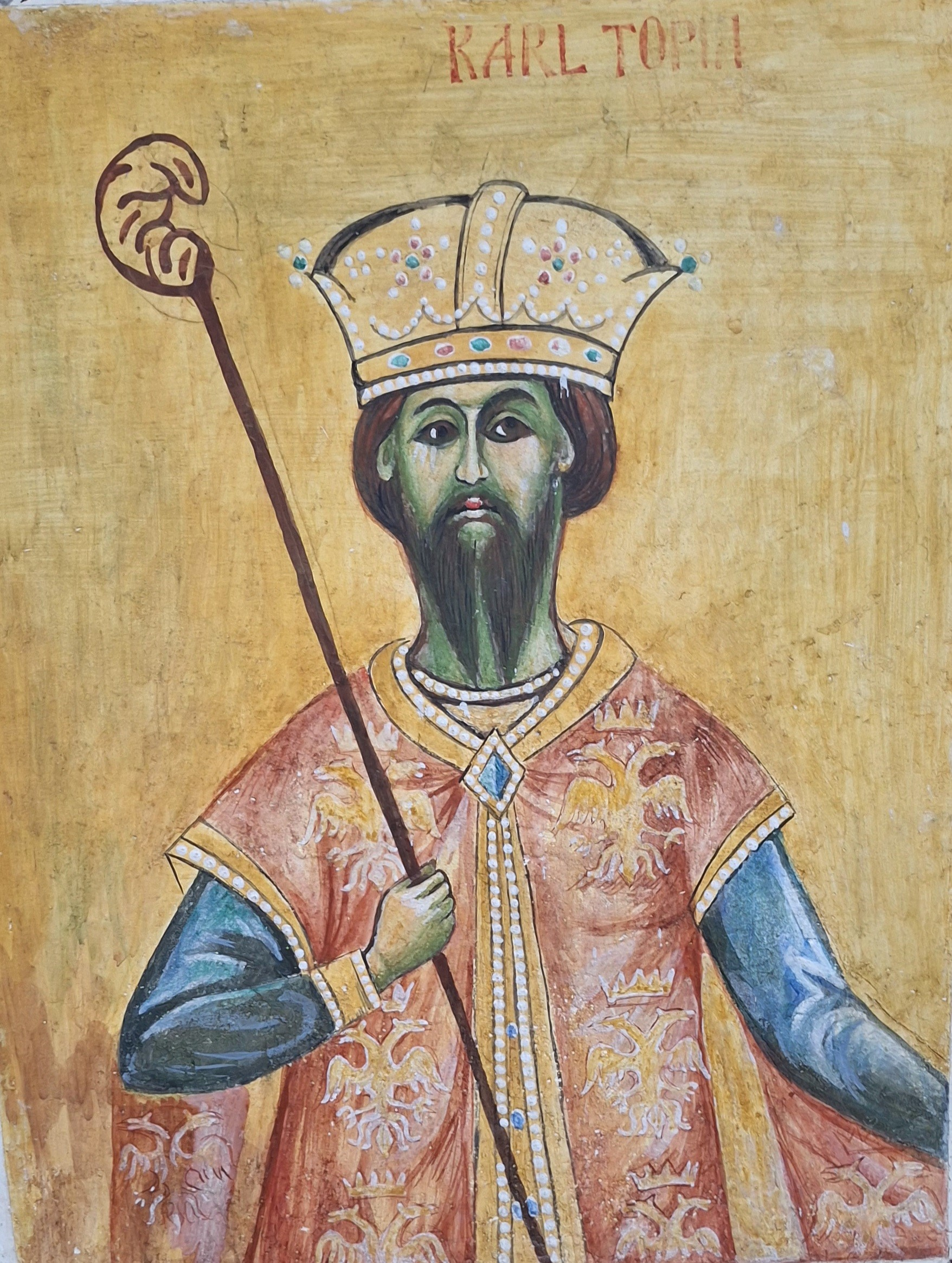
Karl Thopia, who was Prince of Albania, was related to Joanna of Durazzo, and distantly to Louis of Évreux through his mother, Hélène of Anjou.

The final effort by Louis of Évreux to assert his claim to the Kingdom of Albania and restore its rule began in the early 1370s. In 1372, the ranks of the a group of mercenaries from Navarre, known as the Navarrese Company, began to swell after Louis enlisted Enguerrand VII de Coucy, who orchestrated the recruitment of 500 Lancers and 500 mounted archers from Gascony. These troops were assembled to support the campaign to conquer the Kingdom of Albania. Under the terms of the agreement, Louis was to pay de Coucy 15,000 florins upfront, with another 15,000 due upon the completion of the service, which was set to last for one year. The contract also specified that the army was to be assembled within a year, and any barons or powerful figures from Albania who were captured while rebelling against Louis were to be handed over for ransom. However, Karl Thopia and Gjergj I Balsha, two long-time enemies of Louis, were treated differently: they had a fixed ransom of 1,000 ducats each, rather than being subject to the general ransom terms. Louis also enlisted four companies of knights from Navarre to support his claim by 1376. The majority of the soldiers in the Navarrese Company, recruited mainly between 1375 and 1376, came from Navarre and Gascony. They received a monthly payment of 30 florins of Aragon, with the enrolment lists preserved in the Archives of the Cámara de Comptos in Pamplona.

The soldiers from Navarre and Gascony made extensive preparations for the invasion of Albania. However, scant information is available regarding the Albanian expedition overall. Louis garnered substantial martial support in the form of men-at-arms from his brother Charles II, the King of Navarre, and monetary support amounting to 50,000 ducats from Charles V, the King of France. The Navarrese Company was led by four individuals: Pedro de la Saga and Mahiot de Coquerel, both chamberlains of the Navarrese king; John de Urtubia; and Garro (or Guarro), who is documented as a squire. The battle for the city began in the midsummer of 1376, and Louis and the Navarrese Company were successful in occupying Durrës, which reestablished the Kingdom of Albania.

== Aftermath ==
Louis of Évreux died in 1376, the same year he succeeded in gaining back Durrës and reestablishing the Kingdom of Albania. With Louis's death, the Navarrese Company's contract was terminated. They possibly continued to serve Joanna of Durazzo until her remarriage in 1377. Marooned and keen to return to Navarre and Gascony, the Navarrese Company endured between two and three demanding years in destitute Durrës before eventually moving to Morea. There, they entered the service of Jacques de Baux, Nerio Acciajuoli, Juan Fernández de Heredia, and Peter IV of Aragon. Durrës remained under the control of Joanna and her second husband Robert IV of Artois for a few years until Thopia invaded again in 1383, leading to the final disestablishment of the Kingdom of Albania.

== Bibliography ==
- Baker, Julian (2020). Coinage and Money in Medieval Greece 1200–1430. Brill. ISBN 978-9-0044-3434-9.
- Fine, John V. A. (1994). The Late Medieval Balkans: A Critical Survey from the Late Twelfth Century to the Ottoman Conquest. University of Michigan Press. ISBN 978-0-4720-8260-5.
- Hussey, J. M. (1966). The Cambridge medieval history. Volume IV. Part I, The Byzantine empire. Byzantium and its neighbours. University Press. ISBN 978-0-5210-4535-3.
- La Monte, John L (1949). The world of the Middle Ages : a reorientation of medieval history. Appleton-Century-Crofts. ISBN 978-0-8919-7473-4.
- Luttrell, Anthony (1992). The Hospitallers of Rhodes and Their Mediterranean World. the University of Michigan. ISBN 978-0-8607-8307-7.
- Rodd, Rennell (1907). The Princes of Achaia and the Chronicles of Morea: A Study of Greece in the Middle Ages, Volume 2. the University of Wisconsin – Madison. ISBN 978-0-6561-3237-9.
- Setton, Kenneth Meyer (1975). Catalan domination of Athens, 1311-1388. Variorum. ISBN 978-1-2586-6391-9.
- Hazard, Harry W.; Setton, Kenneth Meyer (1975). A History of the Crusades: The fourteenth and fifteenth centuries, edited by Harry W. Hazard. University of Wisconsin Press. ISBN 978-0-2990-6670-3.
- Setton, Kenneth Meyer (1976). The Papacy and the Levant, 1204-1571: The thirteenth and fourteenth centuries. American Philosophical Society.
- Šufflay, Milan (2012). Serbs and Albanians Their Symbiosis in the Middle Ages. GPX Alerion LLC. ISBN 978-0-9887-1292-8.
- Woodacre, Elena (2013). The Queens Regnant of Navarre: Succession, Politics, and Partnerships, 1274-1512. Palgrave Macmillan. ISBN 978-1-1373-3914-0.
- Zacour, Norman P (1960). "Talleyrand: The Cardinal of Périgord (1301-1364)". Transactions of the American Philosophical Society. 50 (7). American Philosophical Society: 1–83. doi:10.2307/1005798. ISBN 978-0-8716-9507-9. JSTOR 1005798.
