= Chinard =

Chinard is a surname. Notable people with the surname include:

- Gazo Chinard (1230–1294), Italian noble lord
- Joseph Chinard (1756–1813), French sculptor
- Philippe Chinard (1205–1266), French nobleman, admiral and governor
- Gilbert Chinard (1881–1972), author, historian
