= Duchy of Durazzo =

Duchy of Durazzo may refer to:

- Duchy of Durazzo, name used by Roger of Howden for the County Palatine of Cephalonia and Zakynthos
- Duchy of Durazzo (Republic of Venice), a short-lived Venetian province in 1205–1213
- Duchy of Durazzo (Angevin), the remnant of the Angevin Kingdom of Albania between 1332 and 1368

== See also ==
- Duke of Durazzo (title)
- Duchy of Dyrrachium
