= Urtubia =

Urtubia is a surname. Notable people with the surname include:

- Juan de Urtubia (died 1381), Navarrese royal squire
- Lucio Urtubia (1931–2020), Spanish anarchist
