= Charles of Durazzo =

Charles of Durazzo may refer to:

- Charles, Duke of Durazzo (1323–1348), duke of Durazzo
- Charles III of Naples or Charles of Durazzo (1345–1386), the former's nephew and son-in-law, king of Naples and Hungary
