= Battle of Durazzo =

Battle of Durazzo may refer to:

- Battle of Dyrrhachium (1081), also known as Siege of Durazzo
- Durrës Expedition (1376)
- Battle of Durazzo (1915)
- Battle of Durazzo (1918)
- Battle of Durrës (1939)
