= Juan de Urtubia =

Juan de Urtubia (Note: The surname is spelled Durthubie or Durthubia in the Pamplonese archives and de Ortobia, Ortubia, or Ortuvia in the Barcelonan archives of the Crown of Aragon. He is sometimes called Joan de Urtúvia in Catalan. In English, his first name is "John".) (died 1381) was a Navarrese royal squire (escudero del Rey in contemporary documents) who led first a contingent of fifty men-at-arms on an expedition to recover the Kingdom of Albania (1376–1377) and later a large army against Thebes and Boeotia, which he conquered in 1379.

== Albania and Achaea ==
In January and February 1374, Urtubia was rewarded 1,000 Aragonese gold florins, some mills by the bridge at Tudela, and the custody of the great castle of Rocafort by Charles II of Navarre for services rendered. In 1375, Urtubia appears as a recruiter for the Navarrese Company in Gascony. He was one of the four original captains of the outfit which went to Albania with Louis of Évreux. He led the largest single societas (sub-company) of the company, at fifty men; he appears in the enlistment roll of 15 February 1375 as Johanco durtuvia escudero del Rey ordenado por yr en el dicto biage dalbania e sus eill e en sus governamiento L hombres darmas como parece por un otro mandamiento del Rey.

After the successful conquest of Durazzo with Navarrese help, the Company disappears from view until Urtubia is found in the Morea in April 1378, leading a hundred men or more in the employ of Nerio I Acciajuoli ("Micer Aner" or "Arner"). Urtubia quickly entered into arrangements with the Hospitallers under Juan Fernández de Heredia and his lieutenant, Gaucher de la Bastide, a Gascon whom Urtubia may have originally met in Gascony a few years prior. Bastide negotiated with Urtubia and another Navarrese captain, Mahiot de Coquerel, leader of a band of 50, for their mercenary services.

== Conquest of Boeotia ==
When Urtubia invaded Boeotia, which was part of the Duchy of Athens, then a possession of another Spanish mercenary company, the Catalan Grand Company, in the spring or early summer of 1379, his army probably numbered much more than one hundred, possibly more than two hundred, which would have been a considerable array in an age "when great organised armies were not known, and often a band of adventurers determined the fate of a country unprepared for war." It is not known why exactly Urtubia attacked Thebes, but it was probably for plunder and power, if not mere adventure. The troops with which Urtubia made his invasion were a remnant of the Navarrese Company which had taken Durazzo, but not the remnant which had retained the structure of the Company, but rather a sort of splinter group composed primarily of the Navarrese complement of the Company, but also comprising Gascons, Italians, Greeks, and disaffected Catalans.

After crossing the territory of his erstwhile employer, Nerio Acciajuoli, Urtubia made for Thebes, the capital of Athens and the chief city of Boeotia. It was a strategic gem, controlling communications between Athens in the south and the Duchy of Neopatria to the north, another Catalan possession. With the support of Niccolò III dalle Carceri, Duke of the Archipelago on his right and Nerio guarding his rear, Urtubia was secure to besiege Thebes for a long time. From the north, too, Francis Zorzi, the Margrave of Bodonitsa, rendered aid against his overlords, the Catalans. The Republic of Venice, which might have stepped in to stop the overtures of Carceri at least, was too involved in the War of Chioggia to be of any help to vulnerable Thebes. Within Thebes, too, disaffected Catalans (mostly those who had supported Frederick III of Sicily against Peter of Aragon in a previous civil war), as well as the majority of Greeks and the archbishop, Simon Atumano, lent tacit support to the besiegers. Finally, Nerio Acciajuoli also lent aid to Urtubia in hopes that he would also conquer Athens.

Galcerán de Peralta, the Catalan captain, castellan, and veguer of Athens, however, rushed to the defence of Thebes, but was captured outside its walls in battle. He was still a prisoner a year later, but, at the request of Peter IV of Aragon, Duke of Athens, the Hospitaller master Heredia secured his release. The city of Thebes eventually fell to Urtubia in May or June 1379.

== After Thebes ==
After Galcerán's failure, Louis Fadrique, the vicar of the duchy, attacked Urtubia (1380), but the latter, with the help of the Hospitallers, fended him off. Fadrique refused to make peace with Urtubia, but the Hospitallers constrained him with thinly veiled threats of war on the Navarrese's behalf.

After the fall of Thebes, the Navarrese under Urtubia conquered Livadeia as well (1381). Urtubia, however, disappears from the record in late fall 1381 and this has been taken to indicate his death. When the Company signed a treaty with Venice on 2 January 1382, Urtubia was not a signatory. By his conquest of Thebes, however, he left his mark on the history of the Catalans in Greece: he brought it to a swift end.
