= Duke of Durazzo (title) =

14th-century noble title

Duke of Durazzo Duke of Durrës Duka i Durrësit
- Royal Arms of the Duke of Durazzo
- Creation date: 1332
- First holder: John of Gravina
- Last holder: Gjergj Thopia
- Status: Title Abolished
- Extinction date: 1392

The Duke or Duchess of Durazzo (Albanian: Duka i Durrësit, Dukesha e Durrësit) also known as Duke or Duchess of Durrës was a noble title used by the rulers of Durrës (city in modern-day Albania) during the middle ages. The title was originally established by the House of Anjou-Durazzo following the decline of the Kingdom of Albania, and it was later adopted by the House of Thopia, one of the major noble families in medieval Albania.

The last holder of the title was the Albanian prince Gjergj Thopia, who was compelled to cede the city of Durrës to the Venetians in 1392.

The modern-day descendants of the Dukes and Duchesses of Durazzo no longer hold any social or political power within the city.

== History and Usage ==
=== Background and the Venetian Duchy ===
During the late 11th and the 12th centuries, the city of Durazzo and its province (the "Theme of Dyrrhachium"), had risen to assume great strategic importance to the Byzantine Empire. The city was the "key of Albania", the western terminus of the Via Egnatia and the main point of entry for trade, but also for the Norman invasions, from Italy, and was ideally placed to control the actions of the Slavic rulers of the western Balkans.

After the sack of Constantinople by the Fourth Crusade and the dissolution of the Byzantine Empire in 1204, the city was left unclaimed. In the partition treaty among the Crusaders, the Republic of Venice had secured recognition of her claims on the westernmost Byzantine provinces, which were crucial in view of the vital Venetian interests in the Adriatic Sea. However, the claim had to be quickly enforced, lest others, and chiefly the Venetians' main rivals, the Genoese, occupy it first. As a result, in the summer of 1205, the Venetian fleet carrying the new Latin Patriarch of Constantinople to his see, also attacked and captured Durazzo and Corfu.

At Durazzo, the Venetians met little opposition and one of the captains, Marino Vallaresso, was appointed governor of Durazzo with the title of duke, a sign of the value the Venetians placed in their new possession. For the same reason they insisted on the appointment of the city's Roman Catholic archbishop, who replaced the previous Greek Orthodox prelate, directly by Venice, without the involvement of the Pope.

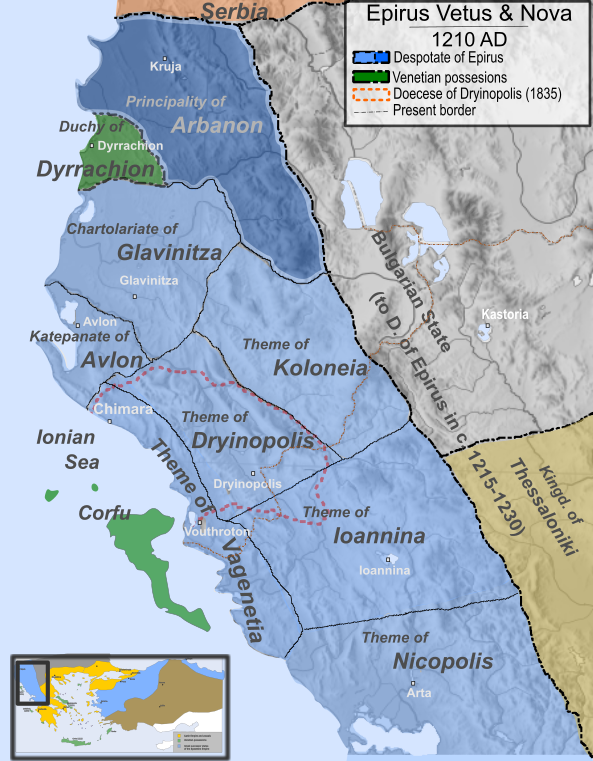
Map of Epirus c. 1210, with the Venetian Duchy of Durazzo and Corfu (in green) and the Despotate of Epirus (in blue)

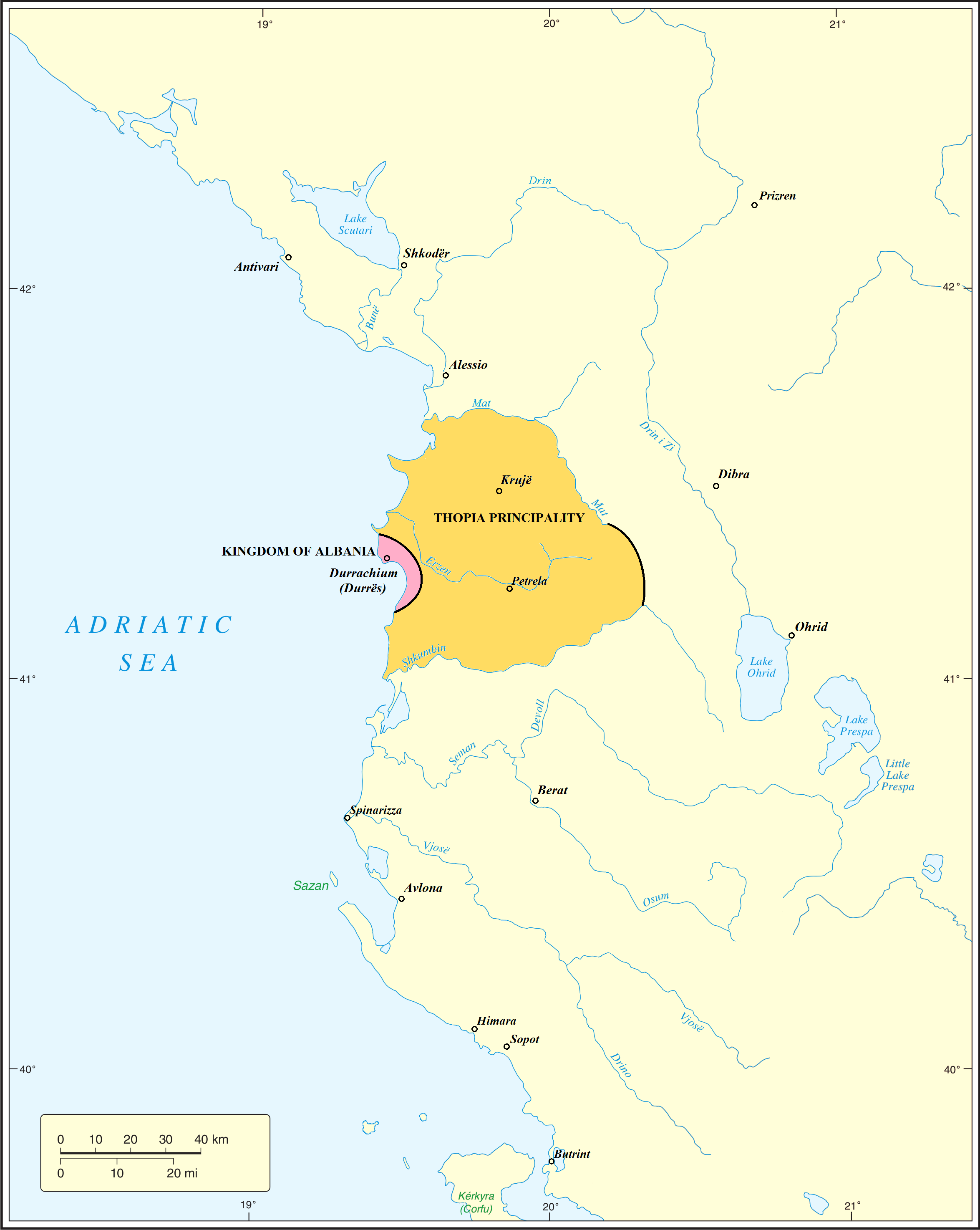
Duchy of Durazzo before being captured by the principality of Albania under Karl Thopia.

Although the Venetians had also laid claim to the mainland region of Epirus, they did not move to establish control there. Consequently, the area came under the rule of a Byzantine Greek aristocrat, Michael I Komnenos Doukas, who established his own principality there, the Despotate of Epirus. Doukas' power grew quickly, and he soon controlled all the mainland between the Venetian Duchy of Durazzo and the Corinthian Gulf in the south. Unable and unwilling to undertake the effort necessary confront him, the Venetians preferred to conclude a compromise treaty with Doukas in June 1210, which recognized him as ruler of Epirus, but as the nominal vassal of Venice, which had claimed this territory since 1204.

This treaty was expedient for Doukas, but did not mean the abandonment of his own designs on Durazzo: in 1213, his forces captured the city, ended the Venetian presence, and restored a Greek Orthodox archbishop to the local see. Soon after, Doukas' forces also took Corfu, and moved to extend his rule over Albania and western Macedonia, capturing the lordship of Krujë and pushing up to the borders of Zeta.

In 1216, the Venetians turned to the new Latin Emperor, Peter II of Courtenay, to help them recover Durazzo. Peter landed at Durazzo in 1217, but although he may have briefly recovered the city, he was soon defeated and captured by Michael Doukas' half-brother and successor, Theodore Komnenos Doukas, and the city returned to Epirote hands.

=== Kingdom of Albania ===
In an attempt to resolve the tensions between the house of Anjou and the Aragonese, the Kingdom of Albania and the lands in Achaea under Angevin dominion were offered in exchange for the Kingdom of Trinacria ruled by Frederick II. These negotiations lasted some years but were abandoned in 1316. Upon the death of Philip of Taranto in 1332, there were various claims on his domains within the Angevin family. The rights of the Duchy of Durazzo (Durrës) and the Kingdom of Albania together were given to John of Gravina with a sum of 5,000 pounds of gold. After his death in 1336, his dominions in Albania passed to his son Charles, Duke of Durazzo.

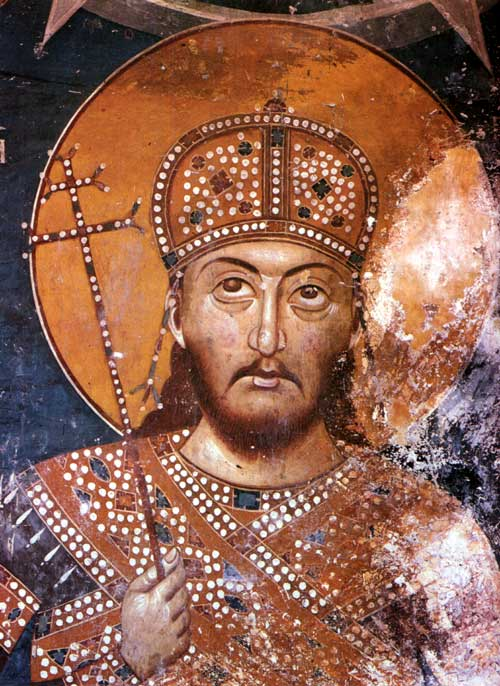
Fresco of Serbian Emperor Stefan Dušan from the Lesnovo Monastery (1350) who had claimed Durrës from the Angevins.

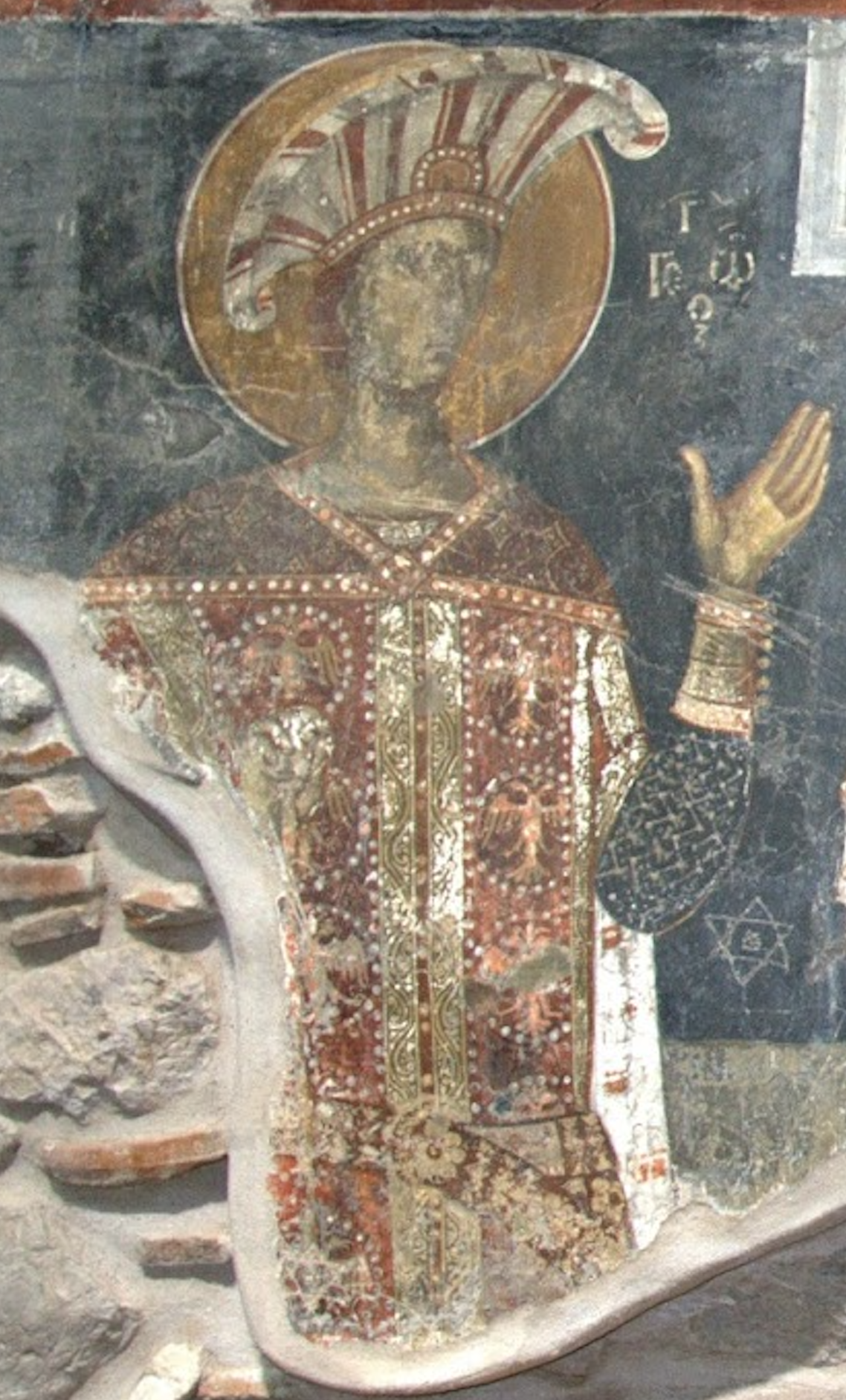
Fresco of Albanian noble and Angevin ally Andrea II Muzaka in the Church of St. Athanasius of Mouzaki in Kastoria (1384)

=== Angevin Duchy of Durazzo ===
The Angevin duchy of Durazzo became a continuation of its previous kingdom in Albania which had lost a majority of its domains (excluding Durrës) after the rise of Serbian King Stefan Milutin and the Albanian principalities. During this period there were different Albanian noble families who began consolidating their power and domains. One of them was the Thopia family whose domains were in central Albania. The Serbs were pressing hard in their direction and the Albanian nobles found a natural ally in the Angevins. Alliance with Albanian leaders was also crucial to the safety of the city, especially during the 1320s and 1330s.

Most prominent among these leaders were the Thopias, ruling in an area between the rivers Mat and Shkumbin, and in 1336, an agreement between the Angevins and Andrea II Muzaka allowed members of the Muzaka family to travel freely to and from Durrës, and the friendly ties between the two noble families remained up until the Muzaka family fled from the Ottoman conquest of Albania. Andrea II led the resistance against the Serbs and formed various alliances with other Albanian noble families such as the Mataranga and Gropa, as well as maintaining ties with his traditional Angevin allies. In August 1336, the Kingdom of Serbia under Stefan Dušan captured Angevin-controlled Durrës. During that time period Durrës was being governed by the Statutes of Durazzo which recognised Angevin control of the city, which Dušan had negotiated with to establish his authority and administration over the city, although the Angevins managed to later recapture Durrës as part of their domains in Albania through re-negotiation.

=== Principality of Albania ===
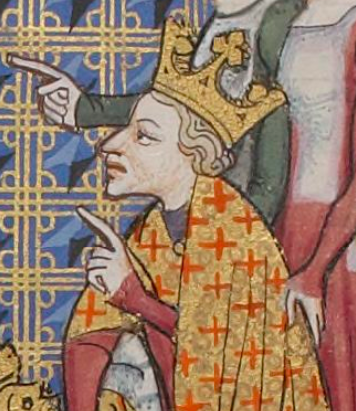
Louis of Évreux's brother Charles II of Navarre, who was King of Navarre and supported his brother on his expedition in Albania.

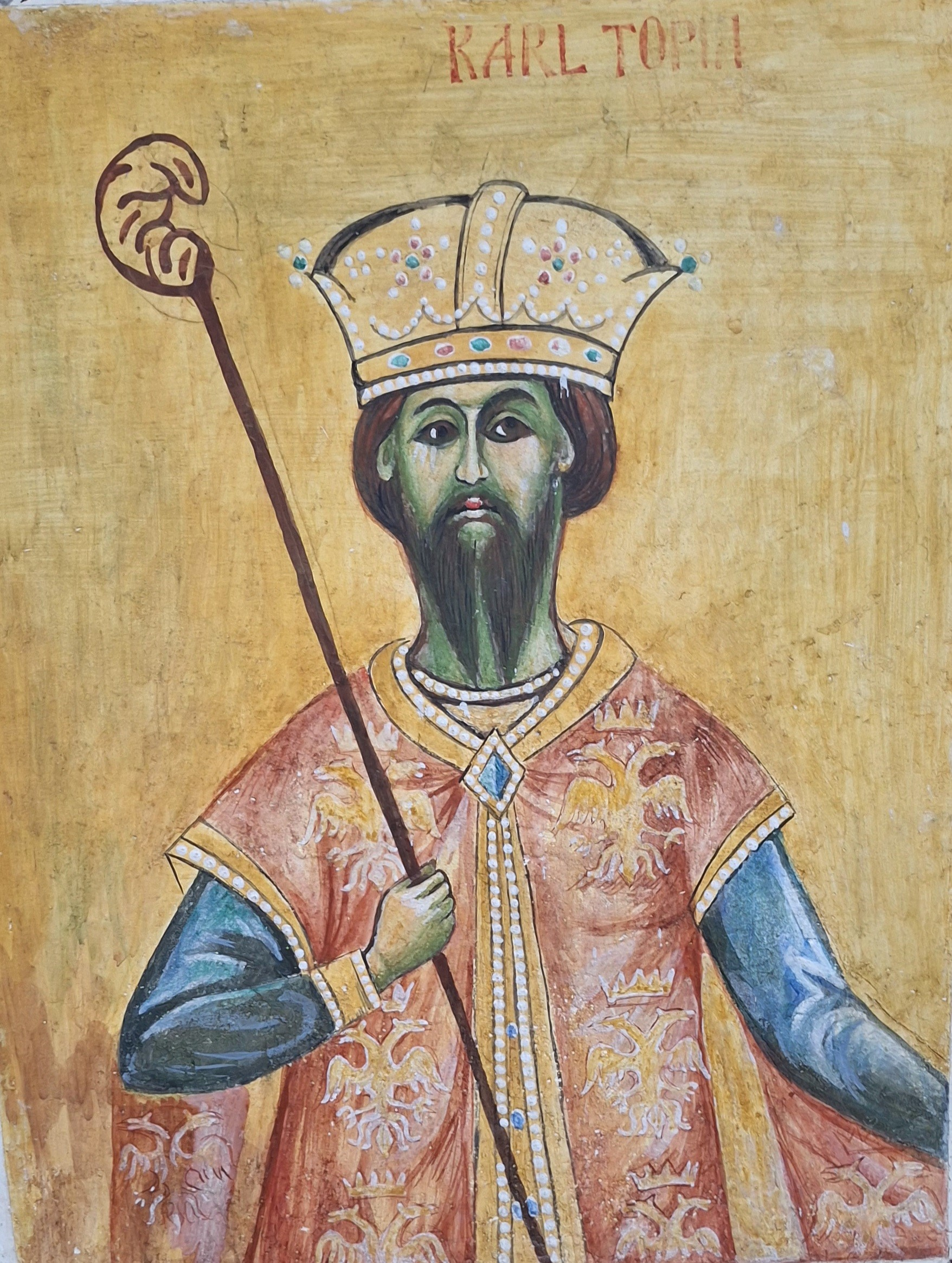
Karl Thopia, Prince of Albania, who sought to defend his claim on Durrës and defeat the Angevins.

In 1358, Albanian nobleman Karl Thopia rose against the rule of the Anjou during the Albanian-Anjou Conflict Since 1362, Karl sought Durrës, which was in the possession of Duchess Joanna. The first, certainly still unsuccessful siege lasted from April 1362 until May 1363. Then, Thopia had to withdraw his troops, who were weakened by an epidemic disease. Later Karl captured Durrës in 1368, which was where the Angevins held out due to their Kingdom becoming smaller in size. After this Karl had plans to turn this important port into his residence. After the capture Joanna, Duchess of Durazzo and her husband Louis of Évreux immediately began planning the reconquest of not only Durrës, but all the lands of the former Angevin Kingdom of Albania. They were successful in gathering the support of Louis' brother Charles II the Bad the King of Navarre and Charles V King of France in this reconquest plan.

Louis of Évreux's final attempt to assert his claim to the Kingdom of Albania began in the early 1370s. In 1372, Enguerrand VII de Coucy led the recruitment of 500 lances and 500 mounted archers from Gascony to bolster the ranks of the Navarrese Company, a mercenary group composed mainly of soldiers from Navarre and Gascony. These troops were gathered to support the campaign aimed at conquering the Kingdom of Albania. By 1376, Louis had also enlisted four companies of knights from Navarre to reinforce his claim. Most of the soldiers in the Navarrese Company were recruited between 1375 and 1376 from Navarre and Gascony. They were paid 30 florins of Aragon per month, with the enrollment records preserved in the Cámara de Comptos archives in Pampeluna. After the death of Louis of Évreux in 1376 Durrës remained under the control of Joanna and her second husband Robert IV of Artois for a few years until Thopia invaded again in 1383, leading to the final disestablishment of the Angevin Kingdom of Albania. Furthermore, Karl Thopia was later recognised as the official legitimate Duke of Durazzo and his successor was his son Gjergj Thopia.

=== Later relinquishment to Venice ===
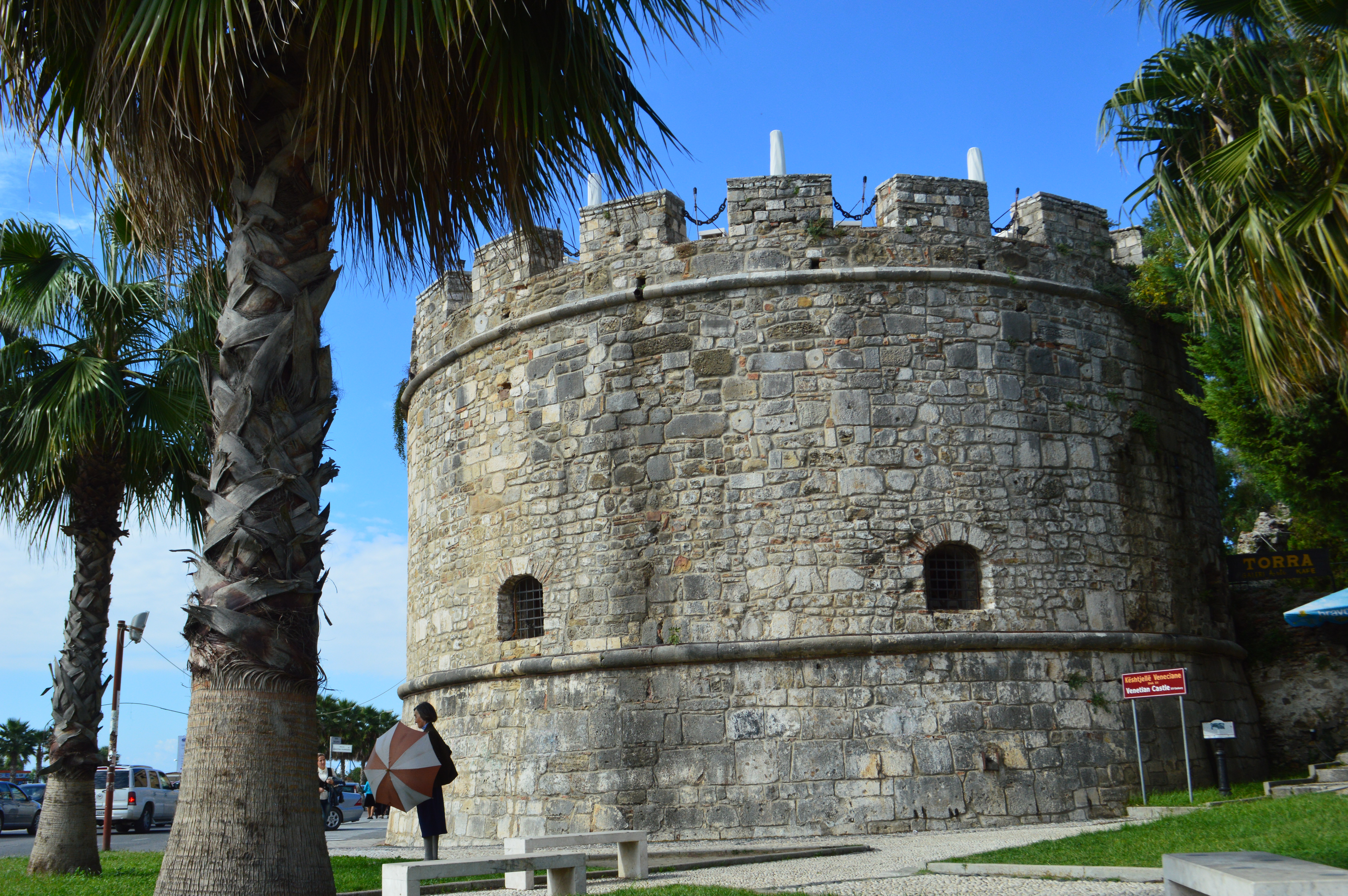
Venetian Tower at Durrës Castle

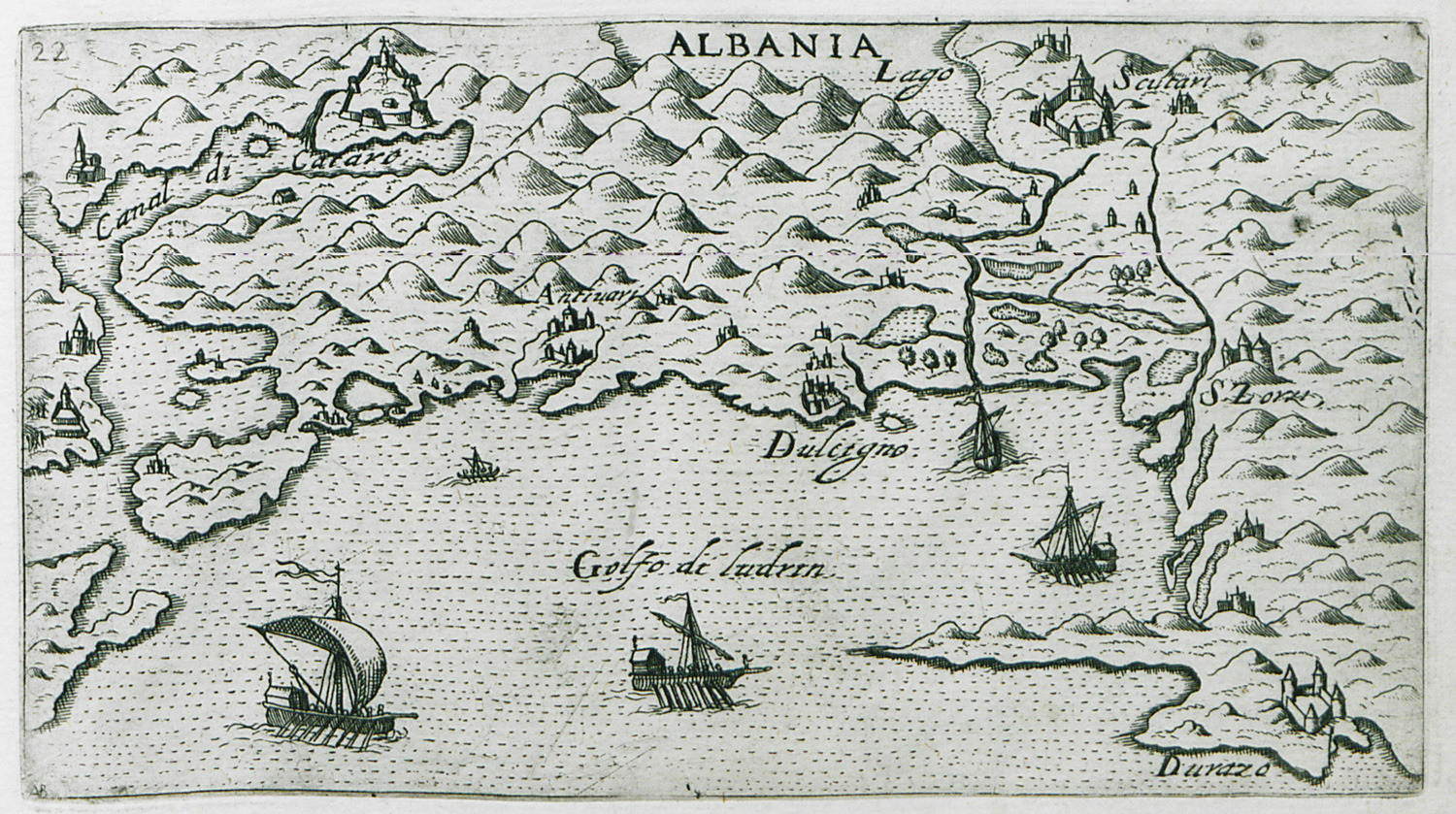
Map of the coast in northern Durrës from Giuseppe Rosaccio in 1598

Following the death of his father Karl, Gjergj Thopia became the new Duke of Durazzo. Once Ottoman forces began conquering areas previously held by local lords, the Venetian Senate reassessed Albania's strategic importance. A pivotal moment in Venice’s involvement came on March 8, 1392, when a Council speech emphasized the urgent need to secure Durrës against the advancing Ottoman threat. A detailed plan was proposed, instructing Captain Saraceno Dandolo to meet with Gjergj Thopia, assure him of Venice's support, and secure Durrës castle with Venetian expenses. The speakers highlighted the substantial investments Venice had made to defend the city and warned of the grave consequences should Durrës fall to the Ottomans. The speech framed Venice’s actions as a moral duty to protect fellow Christians and prevent the city’s capture. The Venetian Council, emphasizing its “sincere affection and love” for Gjergj Thopia and the city of Durrës, reaffirmed their commitment to protecting the city from falling into Ottoman hands. They urged Gjergj to permit Venetian forces to secure the castle of Durrës for the safety of Christianity and the city, while assuring him that he would maintain his rule, governance, and status as lord of Durrës. Gjergj relinquished control of Durrës to Dandolo in 1392, pressured by Venice and weakened by declining health and political instability. After Gjergj’s death, Dandolo formally assumed possession of the city and its territory, marking Durrës’ submission to Venetian authority.

== Venetian Statues of Durazzo ==
The Statues of Durazzo or Statutes of Durrës (Albanian: Statutet e Durrësit) were the highest form of expression of self-government of the Albanian town of Durrës during Medieval Ages. Durrës had a long experience of self-government and privileges charters since confirmed by Byzantine Emperors. When the city was captured by Karl Thopia, who declared himself as the new Duke of Durrës, the statutes were hidden by the community, reappearing in 1392 when the city was handed over to Venetians. The Venetians confirmed the statutes of the city in 1392 and reconfirmed them in 1401 and 1423.

== Aftermath ==
The city of Durrës later fell to the Ottoman Empire and thus became part of the Sanjak of Albania (Ottoman Administrative unit in Albania). The title became extinct and was never used again.

== List of title holders ==
The first title holder was the Venetian captain Marino Vallaresso who was appointed governor of Durazzo with the title of duke, a sign of the value the Venetians placed in their new possession. Later, different houses claimed the title after having control over the city, and their descendants inherited it.

=== House of Anjou-Durazzo ===
Picture	Name	Reign	Notes
	John, Duke of Durazzo	1332–1336	In 1332, Philip of Taranto died and was succeeded by his son Robert of Taranto, who became the new suzerain of Achaea. Not wishing to swear fealty to his nephew, John arranged to surrender Achaea to him in exchange for Robert's rights to the Kingdom of Albania and a loan of 5,000 ounces of gold raised upon Niccolo Acciaiuoli, and thenceforth adopted the title of "Duke of Durazzo".
	Charles, Duke of Durazzo	1336–1348	Charles succeeded his father as Duke of Durazzo and Count of Gravina in 1336.
	Joanna, Duchess of Durazzo	1348–1368 & 1376–1383	The eldest daughter and eldest surviving child of Charles, Duke of Durazzo, and his wife, Maria of Calabria. She succeeded as duchess on the death of her father in 1348 when she was only a child of four years old. Joanna was a member of the House of Anjou-Durazzo. She reigned as Duchess of Durazzo from 1348-1368. She married twice; firstly to Louis of Navarre and then to Robert IV of Artois, Count of Eu.
	Louis, Duke of Durazzo	1365–1368 & 1376	Co-ruled Durazzo after marrying the Duchess Johanna.
	Robert IV of Artois, Count of Eu	1376–1383	Co-ruled the city after marrying the Duchess Joanna in 1376, the city was later conquered by Albanian noble Karl Thopia.

=== House of Thopia ===
Picture	Name	Reign	Notes
	Karl Thopia	1368–1376 & 1383-1388	Prince of Albania, conquered Durazzo from the Angevins. Eventually lost Durazzo to Balsha, later recaptured it.
	Gjergj Thopia	1388-1392	Succeeded his father after his death on the rule of Durazzo, later handed the city over to the Republic of Venice.

=== House of Balsha ===
Picture	Name	Reign	Notes
	Balsha II	1385	Lord of Zeta, conquered Durazzo from Karl Thopia, eventually recaptured by the House of Thopia.
