= Gazo Chinard =

- Born: 1230
- Died: 1294 (aged 63–64)

Gazo Chinard (1230–1294) was a French noble lord, brother or son of Philippe Chinard and vassal of Manfred of Sicily and Charles of Anjou. After the assassination of Philippe Chinard by Michael II of Epirus, Gazo enraged by the act, handed over the territories to Charles of Anjou, who in return appointed him as captain general of Corfu.

The same year as Charles' envoy, he tried to persuade local noblemen and commanders in Albania to surrender Manfred's domains in Albania to Charles of Anjou, but they refused to do so.

In 1272, when Charles of Anjou proclaimed the Kingdom of Albania, he appointed Gazo Chinard as his Vicar-General. In 1273 he was replaced by a French governor.

In 1274 he was in command of a fleet in Ischia. In 1278 he was one of Charles' vassals who was ordered to provide ships for his planned crusade. In 1279 he was the castellan of Bari and later on the commander of the whole fleet in Abruzzo and Apulia. In 1282 he participated in the attack on Sicily in an effort by Charles to recapture the island following the Sicilian Vespers, but with no success. He was removed definitively from command in 1283, on account of old age and he is not mentioned again in the sources.
