= Joanna, Duchess of Durazzo =

Joanna

Duchess of Durazzo
- Reign: 1348–1368; 1376–1383
- Co-rulers: Louis (1365–1368, 1376); Robert (1376–1383)
- Born: 1344
- Died: 20 July 1387 (aged 42 or 43); Castel dell'Ovo, Naples
- Burial: San Lorenzo Maggiore, Naples
- Spouses: Louis of Navarre (m. 1365; died 1376) Robert IV of Artois, Count of Eu (m. 1376; died 1387)
- House: House of Anjou-Durazzo
- Father: Charles, Duke of Durazzo
- Mother: Maria of Calabria

Joanna of Durazzo (1344 – 20 July 1387) was the eldest daughter and eldest surviving child of Charles, Duke of Durazzo, and his wife, Maria of Calabria. She succeeded as duchess on the death of her father in 1348 when she was only a child of four years old. Joanna was a member of the House of Anjou-Durazzo.

She reigned as Duchess of Durazzo from 1348 to 1368. She married twice; firstly to Louis of Navarre and then to Robert IV of Artois, Count of Eu.

== Life ==
Joanna's father died in 1348 and Joanna succeeded him, being the eldest surviving child. However, Joanna remained in Naples rather than going to Durazzo. It was here she was betrothed to her cousin Charles Martel, Duke of Calabria, son of Queen Joanna. Charles Martel was heir in Hungary due to a lack of male heirs. The boy was moved to Hungary, however the engagement was broken when the young boy died around 1348 in Hungary.

In 1365 aged twenty one, Joanna married her first husband Louis of Navarre, who became Duke of Durazzo in right of his wife. He was the son of Joan II of Navarre. In 1368 Durazzo was captured by the Albanian Topia dynasty under the leadership of Prince Karl Thopia. Joanna and her husband immediately began planning the reconquest of not only Durazzo, but all the lands of the former Angevin Kingdom of Albania. They were successful in rallying the support of Louis' brother Charles II the Bad and Charles V King of France in this undertaking. In 1372, Louis brought over the Navarrese Company of mercenaries, who had fought with him during the war in France, to assist them in taking Durazzo. Their ranks swelled considerably in 1375 with new recruits directly from Navarre. Many documents survive telling us of the complex nature of the military planning and engineering which was undertaken to ensure success. This they attained, taking the city in midsummer 1376 during the Durrës Expedition. Louis died shortly after. Louis and Joanna had no children. Joanna kept control of Durrës from 1376 with her new husband Robert IV of Artois, Count of Eu, until Karl Thopia regained the city in 1383.

Around 1376 Joanna remarried to Robert, Count of Eu. This marriage was also childless. Robert was not Count of Eu for long, he and Joanna were not informed of his father's death in 1387. Joanna and Robert were staying at Castel dell'Ovo in Naples where they were both poisoned on July 20, 1387 on the orders of Joanna's sister Margaret, queen dowager and regent of Naples.

Joanna is buried in San Lorenzo Maggiore, Naples.

== Sources ==
- Fine, John Van Antwerp (1994). The Late Medieval Balkans A Critical Survey from the Late Twelfth Century to the Ottoman Conquest. University of Michigan Press. ISBN 978-0-4720-8260-5.
- Setton, Kenneth M. (1975). "The Catalans in Greece". In Hazard, Harry W. (ed.). A History of the Crusades: The Fourteenth and Fifteenth centuries. Vol. III. University of Wisconsin Press.
- Zacour, Norman P. (1960). "Talleyrand: The Cardinal of Périgord (1301–1364)". Transactions of the American Philosophical Society. New Series. 50 (7). American Philosophical Society: 1–83. doi:10.2307/1005798. JSTOR 1005798.

Italian nobility
Preceded by Charles	Duchess of Durazzo; 1348–1368	Succeeded by Karl Thopia as Prince of Albania
