= Charles, Duke of Durazzo =

Charles
- Duke of Durazzo; Count of Gravina
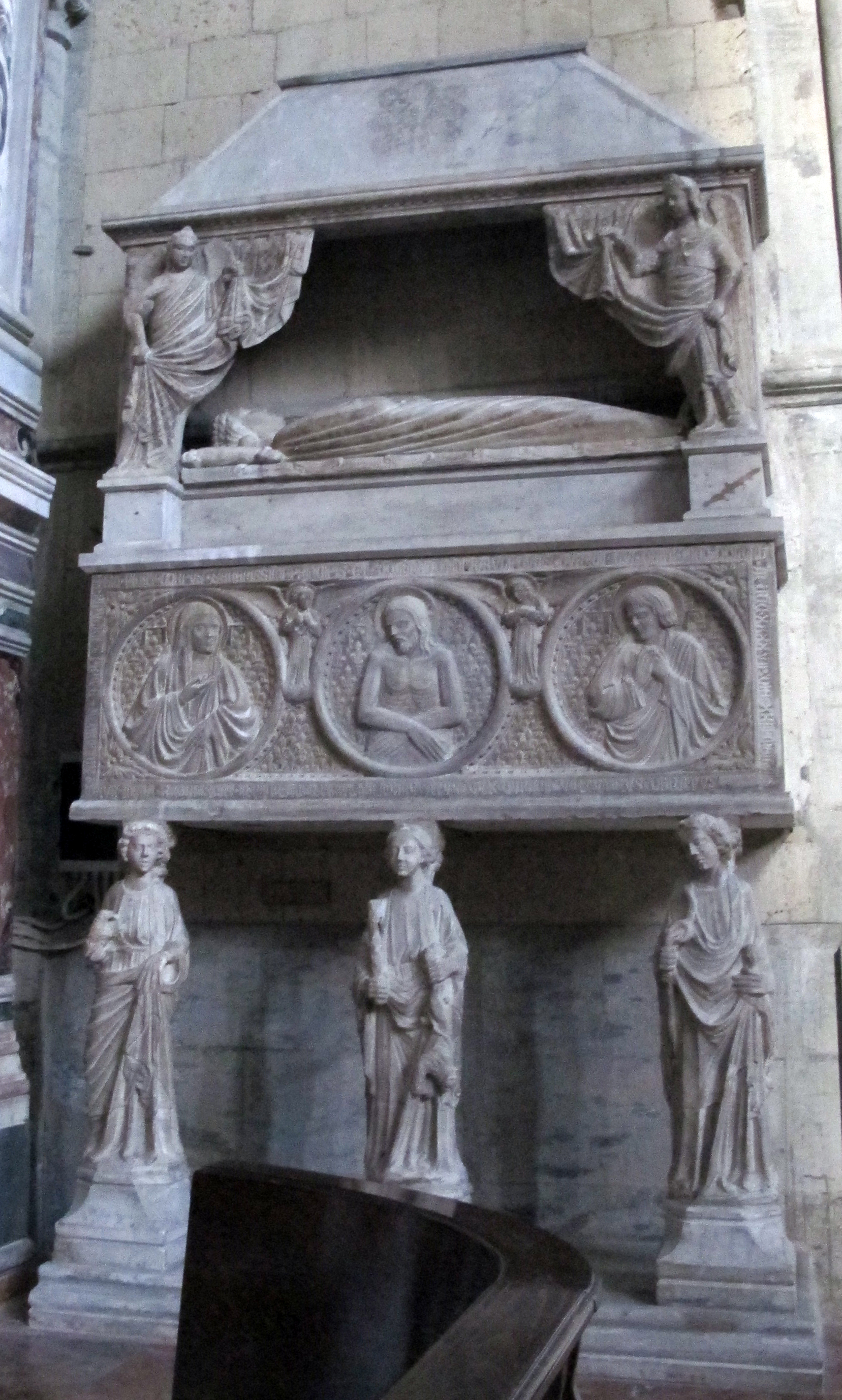
- Tomb of Charles, Duke of Durazzo in Naples

Duke of Durazzo
- Reign: 1336–1348
- Predecessor: John, Duke of Durazzo
- Successor: Joanna, Duchess of Durazzo
- Born: 1323
- Died: 23 January 1348 (aged 24–25)
- Spouse: Maria of Calabria
- Issue: Louis of Durazzo; Joanna, Duchess of Durazzo; Agnes, Latin Empress; Clementia of Durazzo; Margaret, Queen of Naples
- House: House of Anjou-Sicily; House of Anjou-Durazzo
- Father: John, Duke of Durazzo
- Mother: Agnes of Périgord

Charles of Durazzo (Italian: Carlo di Durazzo 1323 – 23 January 1348) was a Neapolitan nobleman, the eldest son of John, Duke of Durazzo and Agnes of Périgord.

== Life ==
Coat of arms of Charles of Durazzo

Charles succeeded his father as Duke of Durazzo and Count of Gravina in 1336.

On 21 April 1343, he married Maria of Calabria, Countess of Alba, in Naples. She was the younger daughter of Charles, Duke of Calabria and sister of Joanna I of Naples, and had been intended as a bride for Louis I of Hungary or John II of France, but was abducted by Charles and his mother to make a marriage that would place Charles closer to the throne of Naples.

Keeping carefully aloof from the conspiracy that murdered Joanna's husband Andrew, Duke of Calabria, he led a faction opposing Joanna and Louis of Taranto. He contacted the Hungarian court, seeking their support. He hoped to turn the invasion of Louis of Hungary and the flight of Joanna to his own ends, but he was seized and beheaded by the Hungarians at Aversa.

== Issue ==
Charles and Maria had:

- Louis (December 1343 – 14 January 1344)
- Joanna (1344–1387), Duchess of Durazzo; married first in 1366 Louis of Navarre, Count of Beaumont (d. 1376), married second Robert IV of Artois, Count of Eu (d. 1387)
- Agnes (1345–1383, Naples), married first on 6 June 1363 Cansignorio della Scala, Lord of Verona (d. 1375), married second James of Baux (d. 1383)
- Clementia (1346–1363, Naples)
- Margaret (28 July 1347 – 6 August 1412), married in February 1368 to Charles III of Naples

== Bibliography ==
- Bartlett, Robert (2020). Blood Royal: Dynastic Politics in Medieval Europe. Cambridge University Press.
- Zacour, Norman P. (1960). "Talleyrand: The Cardinal of Périgord (1301–1364)". Transactions of the American Philosophical Society. New Series. 50 (7). American Philosophical Society: 1–83. doi:10.2307/1005798. JSTOR 1005798.
- Topping, Peter (1975). "The Morea, 1364–1460". In Setton, Kenneth M.; Hazard, Harry W. (eds.). A History of the Crusades, Volume III: The Fourteenth and Fifteenth Centuries. Vol. 3. Madison and London: University of Wisconsin Press. pp. 141–166. ISBN 0-299-06670-3.

Charles, Duke of Durazzo House of Anjou Cadet branch of the House of Capet
Preceded by John, Duke of Durazzo	Duke of Durazzo; 1336 – 1348	Succeeded by Joanna, Duchess of Durazzo
Preceded by John, Duke of Durazzo	Count of Gravina; 1336 – 1348	Succeeded by Louis of Durazzo
