= Florin (Aragonese coin) =

Gold coin minted in the Kingdom of Aragon

The Florin was an Aragonese gold coin first minted in 1346 by order of king Don Peter IV in imitation of the original gold coin from Florence, Italy. It had a weight of 3.35 g. and showed St. John the Baptist on one side and a fleur de lis on the other. Aragonese florins were minted in Perpignan, Barcelona, Girona (Principality of Catalonia), Valencia and Majorca but never in the Kingdom of Aragon.
