= Louis, Duke of Durazzo =

- Count of Beaumont-le-Roger; Duke of Durazzo
- Arms of Louis

Duke of Durazzo
- Reign: 1365–1368, 1376
- Predecessor: Joanna, Duchess of Durazzo
- Successor: Robert IV of Artois, Count of Eu
- Co-ruler: Joanna, Duchess of Durazzo
- Born: 1341
- Died: 1376 (aged 34–35); Durrës, Kingdom of Albania
- Spouse: Maria de Lizarazu; Joanna, Duchess of Durazzo
- Issue: Juana de Beaumont; Carlos de Beaumont; Tristan de Beaumont
- House: House of Évreux
- Father: Philip of Évreux
- Mother: Joan II of Navarre

Louis of Évreux (also called "of Navarre"; 1341 – 1376) was the youngest son of Philip III of Navarre and Joan II of Navarre. He inherited the county of Beaumont-le-Roger from his father (1343) and became Duke of Durazzo in right of his second wife, Joanna, in 1366.

Louis's first marriage was to Maria de Lizarazu in 1358. He took part on behalf of his brother Charles II of Navarre in the war against the Dauphin Charles.

His second marriage to Joanna, Duchess of Durazzo, brought him the rights to Durazzo and the Kingdom of Albania, which he strove to recover. He received assistance from both his brother and the king of France in this undertaking for Durazzo (the remnant of the kingdom) was in the hands of Charles Thopia. In 1372, he brought over the Navarrese Company of mercenaries, who had fought with him during the war in France, to assist him in taking Durazzo. Their ranks swelled considerably in 1375 with new recruits directly from Navarre. Many documents survive providing information on the complex nature of the military planning and engineering which was undertaken to ensure success. This they attained, taking the city in midsummer 1376 during the Durrës Expedition. Louis died shortly after in the same year.

He had an illegitimate son, Carlos de Beaumont, who would be the founder of the House of Beaumont, which would have a main role in the Navarrese Civil War next century. Carlos de Beaumont had a daughter named Juana Margaret de Beaumont who was the grandmother of Jaime Vélaz de Medrano y Echauz, famous for his defense of the Navarrese kingdom against the spanish conquest at the battle of Amaiur-Maya in 1522.

== Family ==
Louis had no legitimate children with his Angevin wife Joanna, Duchess of Durazzo, although he had many illegitimate children with his mistress Maria de Lizarazu who was a Navarrese noblewoman. Louis's three illegitimate children were Carlos, Tristan, and Juana.

1. Juana de Beaumont (1359; † 1411), was the first born of Louis. She married Pedro de Lasaga in 1373.
2. Carlos de Beaumont (1361; † 1432), was second born of Louis. He became lieutenant of the Kingdom of Navarre by his uncle Charles II of Navarre in 1379, castellan of San Juan de Pie de Puerto and Lord of Asiáin in 1381. He was first married to Maria Jimenez de Urrea in 1396 and had two children. His second marriage to Anne of Curton in 1407 and had six children. He also had five illegitimate children as well.
3. Tristan de Beaumont (1363; † 1396), was the youngest of Louis's children. He was the canon of the Pamplona Cathedral.

== See also ==
- Battle of Durazzo (1376)
- Joanna, Duchess of Durazzo
- Kingdom of Albania (medieval)

== Sources ==
- Leroy, Beatrice (2003). "L'animation de la cour de Navarre (vers 1350 - vers 1430)". In Marchandisse, Alain; Kupper, Jean-Louis (eds.). A l'ombre du pouvoir: les entourages princiers au Moyen Age (in French). Librairie Droz.238
- Woodacre, Elena (2013). The Queens Regnant of Navarre: Succession, Politics, and Partnerships, 1274-1512. Palgrave Macmillan.
- Setton, Kenneth M.; Hazard, Harry W., eds. (1975). A History of the Crusades, Volume III: The Fourteenth and Fifteenth Centuries. Vol. 3. Madison and London: University of Wisconsin Press. ISBN 0-299-06670-3.
