= Robert IV of Artois, Count of Eu =

Robert IV of Artois
- Count of Eu; Duke of Durazzo
- Arms of Robert

Duke of Durazzo
- Reign: 1376–1383
- Predecessor: Louis, Duke of Durazzo
- Co-ruler: Joanna, Duchess of Durazzo
- Born: 1356
- Died: 20 July 1387 (aged 30–31); Castel dell'Ovo, Naples
- Burial: San Lorenzo Maggiore, Naples
- Spouse: Joanna, Duchess of Durazzo
- House: House of Artois
- Father: John of Artois, Count of Eu
- Mother: Isabeau of Melun

Robert IV of Artois (1356 – 20 July 1387), son of John of Artois, Count of Eu and Isabeau of Melun, was Count of Eu from April to July 1387 and Duke of Durazzo from 1376 to 1383.

About 1376, he married Joanna of Durazzo, daughter of Charles, Duke of Durazzo. Robert became the Duke of Durazzo through the right of his wife until 1383 when Karl Thopia took over Durrës. (Note: "The Angevins retained Durazzo for a time, for in 1379 Joanna's new husband, Robert of Artois, is found issuing to Dubrovnik a charter pertaining to Durazzo. Karlo Thopia, who held the territory both north and south of the city, soon, probably in 1383, regained possession of Durazzo...") Robert inherited the County of Eu upon his father's death on 6 April 1387, along with Saint-Valery and Ault. However, as he was in Naples at the time, he never learned of his father's death nor did he rule his lands. On 20 July 1387, he and his wife were poisoned on the orders of Joanna's own sister Margaret, Queen Regent of Naples, while they were staying at Castel dell'Ovo. Robert and Joanna were buried in the church of San Lorenzo Maggiore in Naples.

The marriage of Robert and Joanna was childless. Robert was succeeded in his titles by his younger brother, Philip, who would become the Constable of France.

== Sources ==
- Baker, Julian (2020). Coinage and Money in Medieval Greece 1200-1430. Brill. ISBN 978-9-0044-3434-9. "...The Navarrese then handed over the town to Robert of Artois, Joanna of Durazzo's second husband..."
- Deck, Suzanne (1924). Bibliothèque de l'École des hautes études: Sciences historiques et philologiques (in French). Librairie Ancienne Edouard Champion.
- Fine, John Van Antwerp (1994). The Late Medieval Balkans A Critical Survey from the Late Twelfth Century to the Ottoman Conquest. University of Michigan Press. ISBN 978-0-4720-8260-5.
- Setton, Kenneth M. (1975). "The Catalans in Greece". In Hazard, Harry W. (ed.). A History of the Crusades: The Fourteenth and Fifteenth centuries. Vol. III. University of Wisconsin Press.

Preceded by John	Count of Eu; 1387	Succeeded by Philip
