= Philippe Chinard =

Philippe Chinard (1205 - 1266) was a French nobleman, admiral and governor of Manfred of Sicily. After Manfred had captured some territories in Albania, Philip was appointed as Manfred's general governor of those dominions. Initially based in Corfu, Chinard moved his headquarters to Kanina, then the dominant center of the Vlorë region, where he married a relative of Michael II Komnenos Doukas.

Upon hearing the news of Manfred's death in the Battle of Benevento, Michael II conspired and managed to kill Philippe Chinard, with the help of Chinard's wife, but he could not capture Manfred's domains.
