= Lazise =

- Comune
- Comune di Lazise
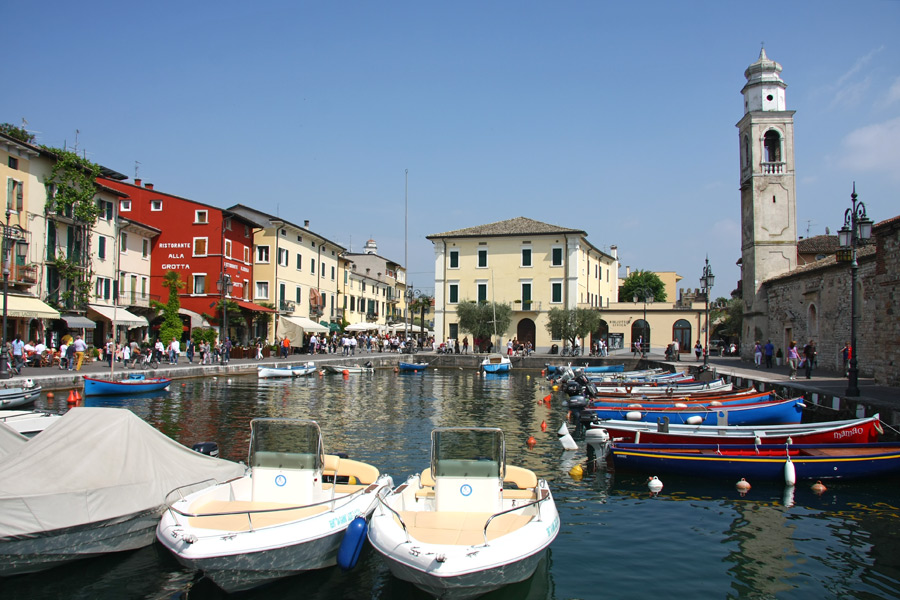
- Lazise

- Location within Italy Location within Veneto
- Coordinates: 45°31′N 10°44′E
- Country: Italy
- Region: Veneto
- Province: Province of Verona (VR)
- Frazioni: Colà, Pacengo

Area
  - Total: 65.0 km^{2} (25.1 sq mi)
- Elevation: 76 m (249 ft)

Population (Dec. 2004)
  - Total: 6,213
  - Density: 95.6/km^{2} (248/sq mi)
- Demonym: Lazisiensi
- Time zone: UTC+1 (CET)
  - Summer (DST): UTC+2 (CEST)
- Postal code: 37017, 37010 frazioni
- Dialing code: 045
- Website: Official website

Lazise is a comune (municipality) and town in the Province of Verona in the Italian region Veneto, located about 120 kilometres (75 miles) west of Venice and about 20 kilometres (12 miles) northwest of Verona. It is situated on the eastern shore of Lake Garda. As of 31 December 2004, it had a population of 6,213 and an area of 65.0 square kilometres (25.1 sq mi). This geographical location empowers a position of great landscape value, but it also features elements of architectural value and of historical importance.

Lazise has many attractions: a thermal spring situated in Colà, two amusement parks (Canevaworld and Gardaland, the latter situated partly on the territory of Castelnuovo del Garda, where it is based, and partly on the territory of Lazise) and an extensive hilly agricultural landscape. Lazise records about 3.5 million tourist visits every year, figures that place it at 12th place in Italy among tourist destinations, and the first Italian lake destination.

The municipality of Lazise contains the frazioni (subdivisions, mainly villages and hamlets) of Colà and Pacengo.

Lazise borders the following municipalities: Bardolino, Bussolengo, Castelnuovo del Garda, Padenghe sul Garda, Pastrengo, Peschiera del Garda and Sirmione.

== Origins of the name ==
The name Lazise comes from the Latin word lacus that means ‘lakeside village’, as some documents of Early Middle Ages seem to confirm, referring to the settlement as Laceses. Another hypothesis, later ruled out, put the name of the town as originating from Antonio Bevilacqua di Loncis. Loncis, from his castle in Bavaria, became governor of Lake Garda and the forefather of a major family that then changed its name to Bevilacqua-Lazise. The last hypothesis was lately ruled out and it comes from Lazica Kingdom.

== History ==
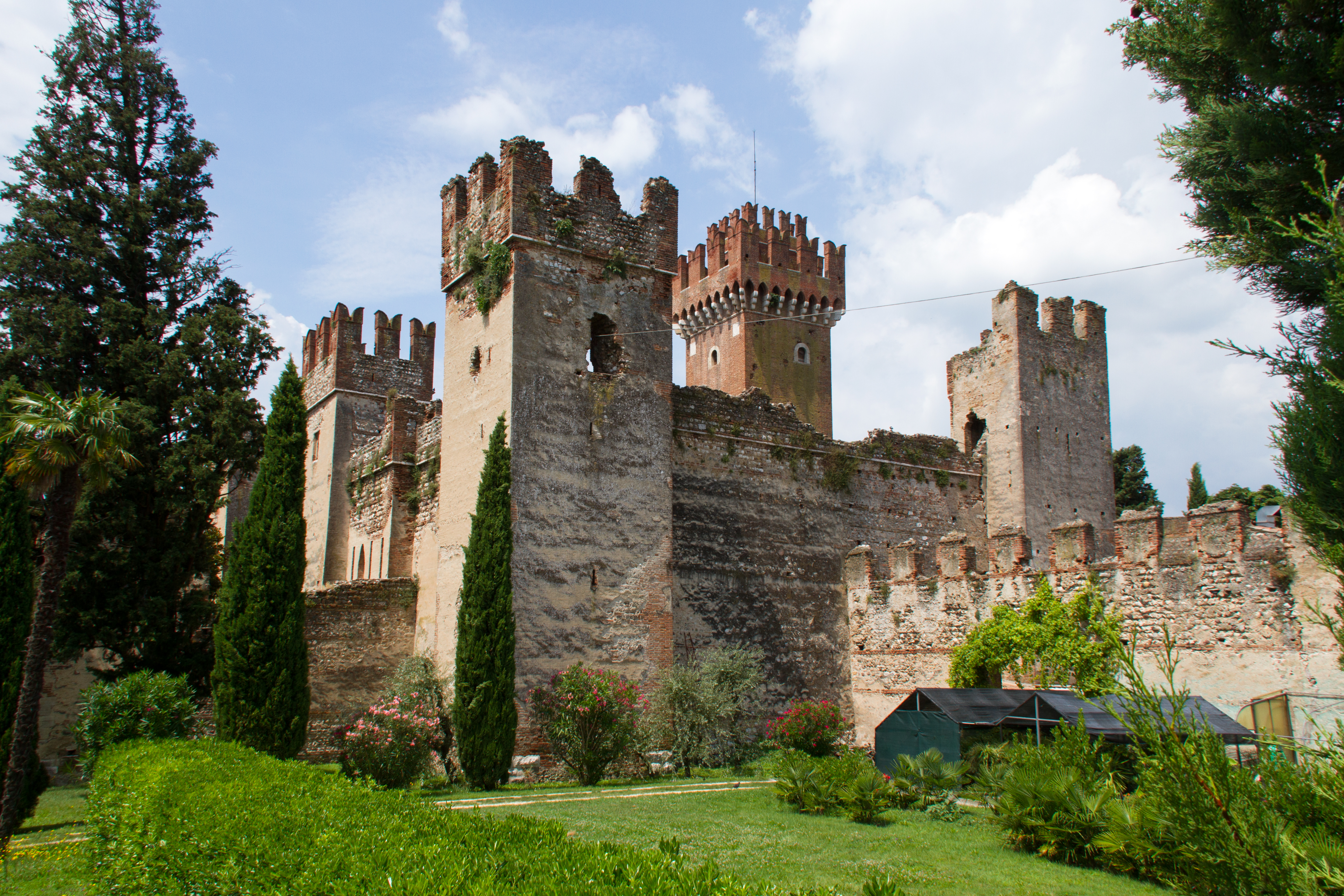
Castle of Lazise

Its name derives from the Latin "lacus" which means lacustrine village. Lazise in fact was originally a group of stilt houses beyond that Roman village and market. Between 888 and 961, during the reign of Berengar II of Italy and his son, the town was subject only to the monarch, that is, it was a "free villa" not subject to any feudatory. In 961, Italy was invaded by German troops, who descended the valley of the Adige to camp on the shores of Garda.

In 983, the Holy Roman Emperor Otto I granted Lazise the right to fortify itself and establish trading rights. It is considered as the first and oldest comune in Italy, and perhaps all of Europe. The medieval Church of Saint Nicolò has frescoes dating from the 12th century, by the school of Giotto. The customs house from the 16th century was constructed to control trade on the lake. During the 13th and 14th centuries, Lazise was occupied by the Scaligeri of Verona who built the castle and encircled the town with walls.

In 1405, it came under Venetian Republic rule until Napoleon conquered northern Italy in 1796.

After the Congress of Vienna (1815) when it entered a period of Austrian rule, until in 1866, it was incorporated into the Kingdom of Italy.

The 14th-century La Pergolana villa, a kilometre north of Lazise, hosts a honey festival during the first weekend of October.

== Tourism ==
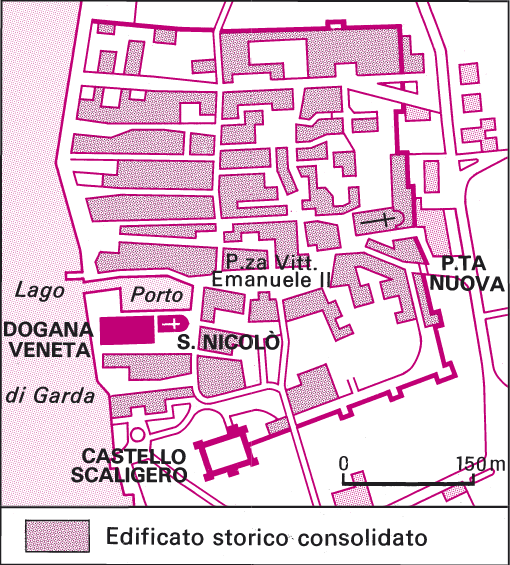
City map

The city is a holiday destination, and attracts tourists from the immediate area owing to its views of the Alps from the southern shore of Lake Garda.

At the center of the city is a series of interconnected piazze that house numerous open-air cafés, various shops, gelaterie (ice-cream parlours), and bars.

Due to its strategic location (close to beaches, campsites, and amusement parks), Lazise is a popular destination, which history and culture enthusiasts may prefer to visit outside of peak season. However, summer is undoubtedly the liveliest time of year to explore Lazise. You can walk into the old town of Lazise through one of the three gates in the medieval walls (built in 1329): Porta San Zeno, Porta del Lion, and Porta Cansignorio.

== Scaliger Castle ==
The most imposing building of Lazise is the Scaliger Castle and the city wall that surrounds the historic centre. The castle was built during the domination of the lords of Verona Bartolomeo II and Antonio della Scala, or maybe just before the father Cansignorio della Scala (considering that Porta Nuova bears the date 21 May 1376). The city has always had three gates equipped with drawbridges: Porta Superiore, today known as Porta San Zeno, for the access on east side; Porta Lion (so called because it determined the coat of arms of the Serenissima), for the access on south side; Porta Nuova (so named because it was the last to be built), today widely called Porta Cansignorio, for access on north side. The castle suffered damages during the siege of the Venetians in July 1438, and then again in May 1528 due to the work of the army of Charles V. In the 16th century, with the progress of new technologies and war tactics, the castle lost importance and was purchased firstly by the community of Lazise and later by private families.

== Coat of arms ==
Originally, the coat of arms of Lazise municipality was a checkered shield with light-blue and silver diamond, in line with the ancient Bavarian Kingdom coat of arms. Afterwards, the coat of arms was divided: the left side is formed by a silver and light-blue checkered flag; on the right side a red dragon in a golden field is portrayed.

== Traditions and folklore ==
Traditional events are the Regata delle Bisse, using traditional Venetian rowing boats (with four standing rowers and no helmsman), whose stop in Lazise takes place between July and August, and the Cuccagna del Cadenon, which takes place at the end of August in conjunction with the Festa dell’Ospite, in which an eight-metre pole is placed horizontally on the waters of the old port, abundantly coated with fat, and is won by the one who, slipping on the greasy pole, manages to take the flag to the bottom.

== Events ==
Celebrations that regularly take place in the village are numerous, in particular fairs and festivals: the Festa dell'Ospite, that is held at the end of July in Pacengo (a neighbouring town) and at the end of August in Lazise, when there are various stands that sell typical local products, concerts and a final show with fireworks; the Antica sagra della Madonna della Neve that takes place in the municipality of Colà at the beginning of August, during which the traditional plate of anara col pien (stuffed and roast duck) is served; la Sagra del Marciapié, an old feast that is celebrated on the last day of Carnival and the first of Lent in Via Arco, during which citizens are invited to choose the representatives of the street named Via Capo Valàr, in addition to the carnival masks; lastly the national fair I giorni del miele, a trade fair completely dedicated to honey and its derivatives held at the beginning of October.

== Gallery ==
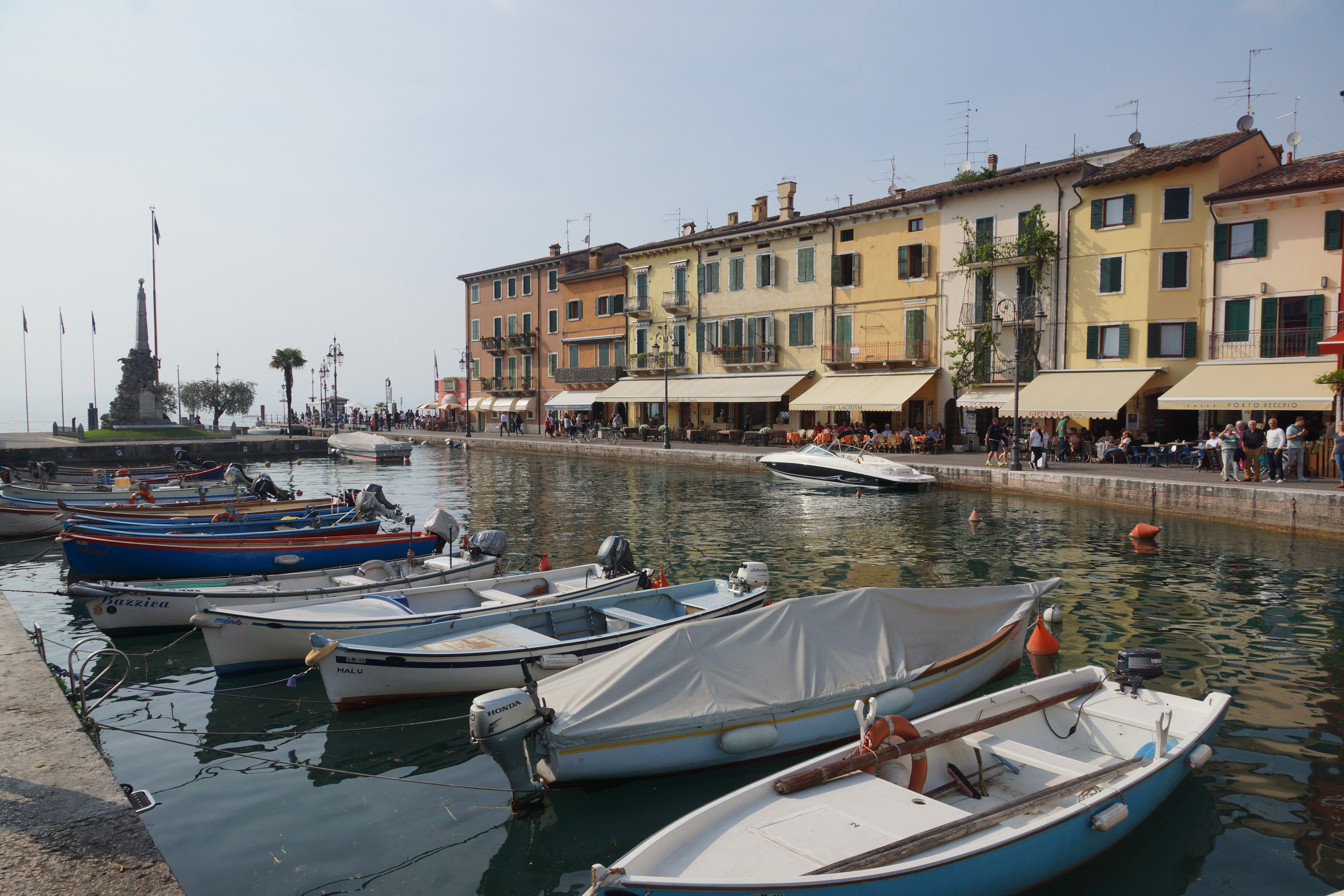
Old port

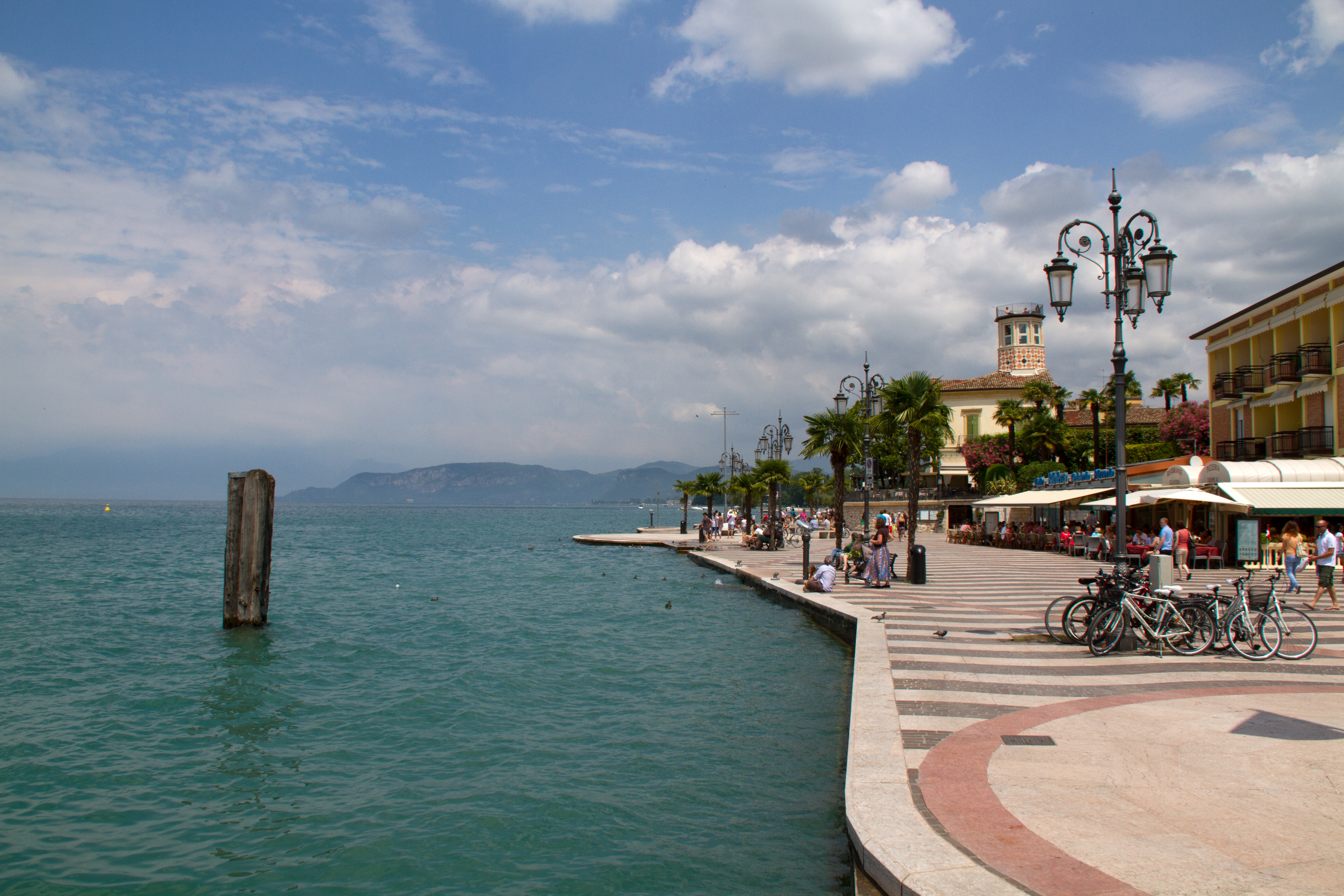
Lake front

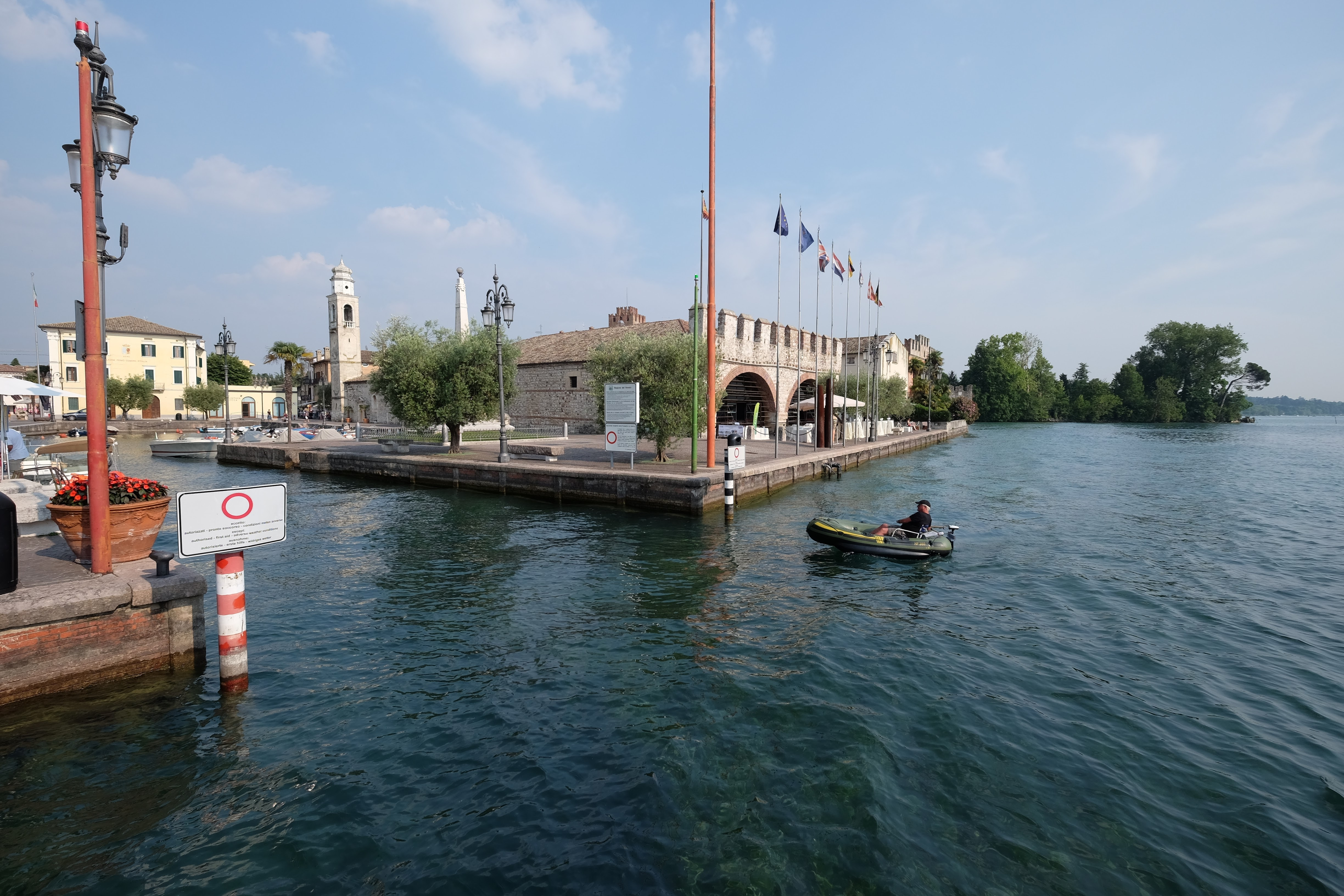

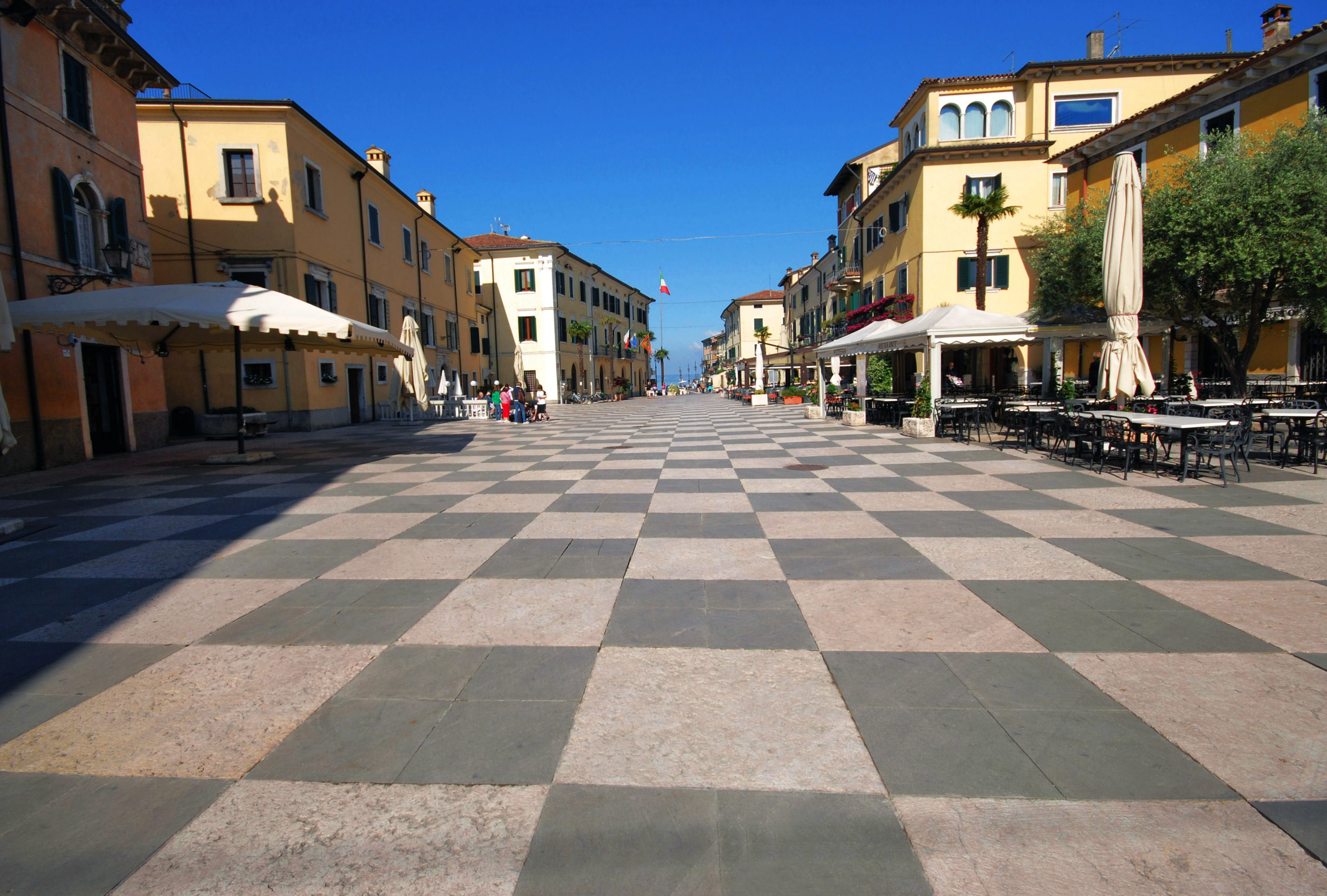
Piazza Vittorio Emanuele

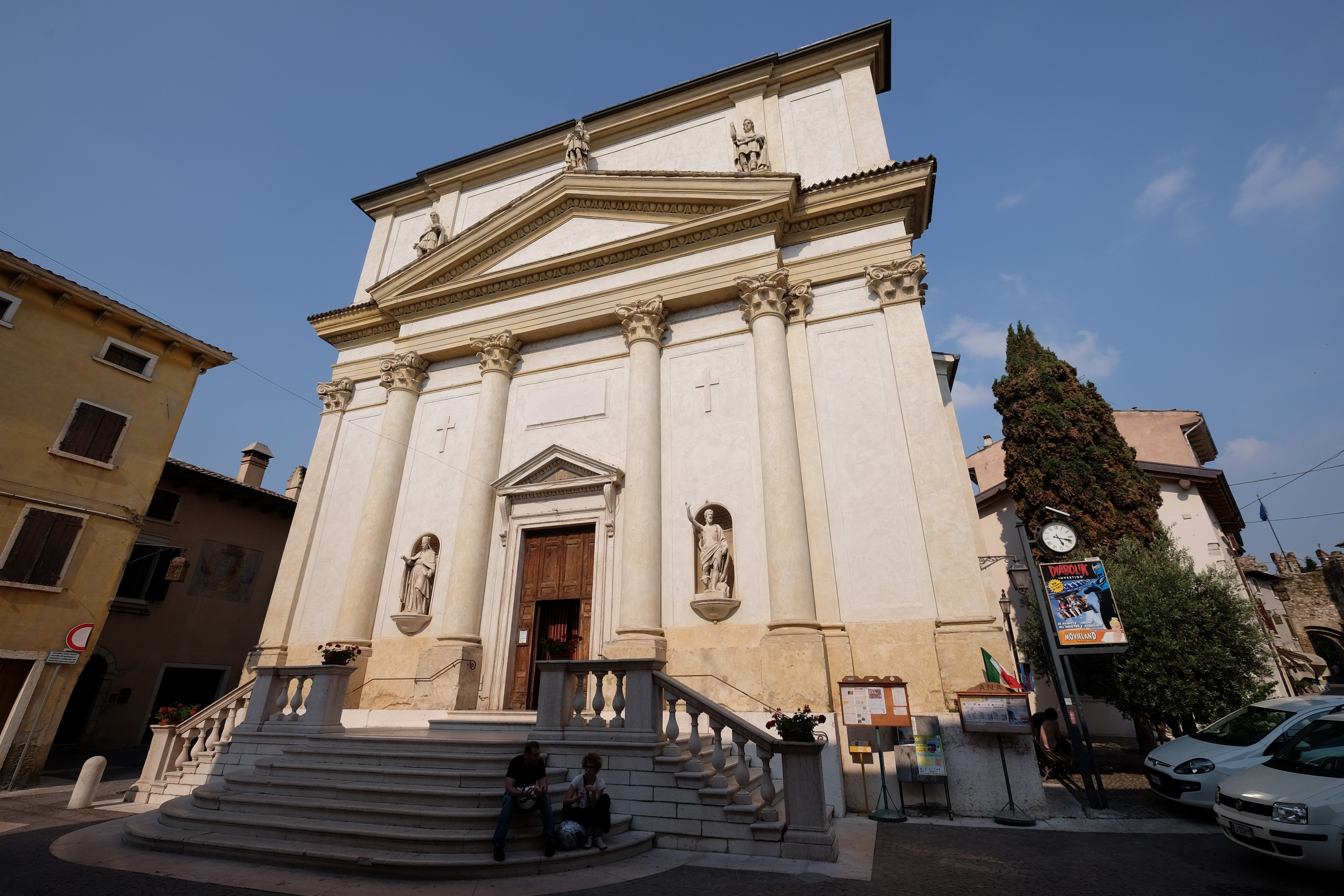
Chiesa parrocchiale dei Santi Zenone e Martino

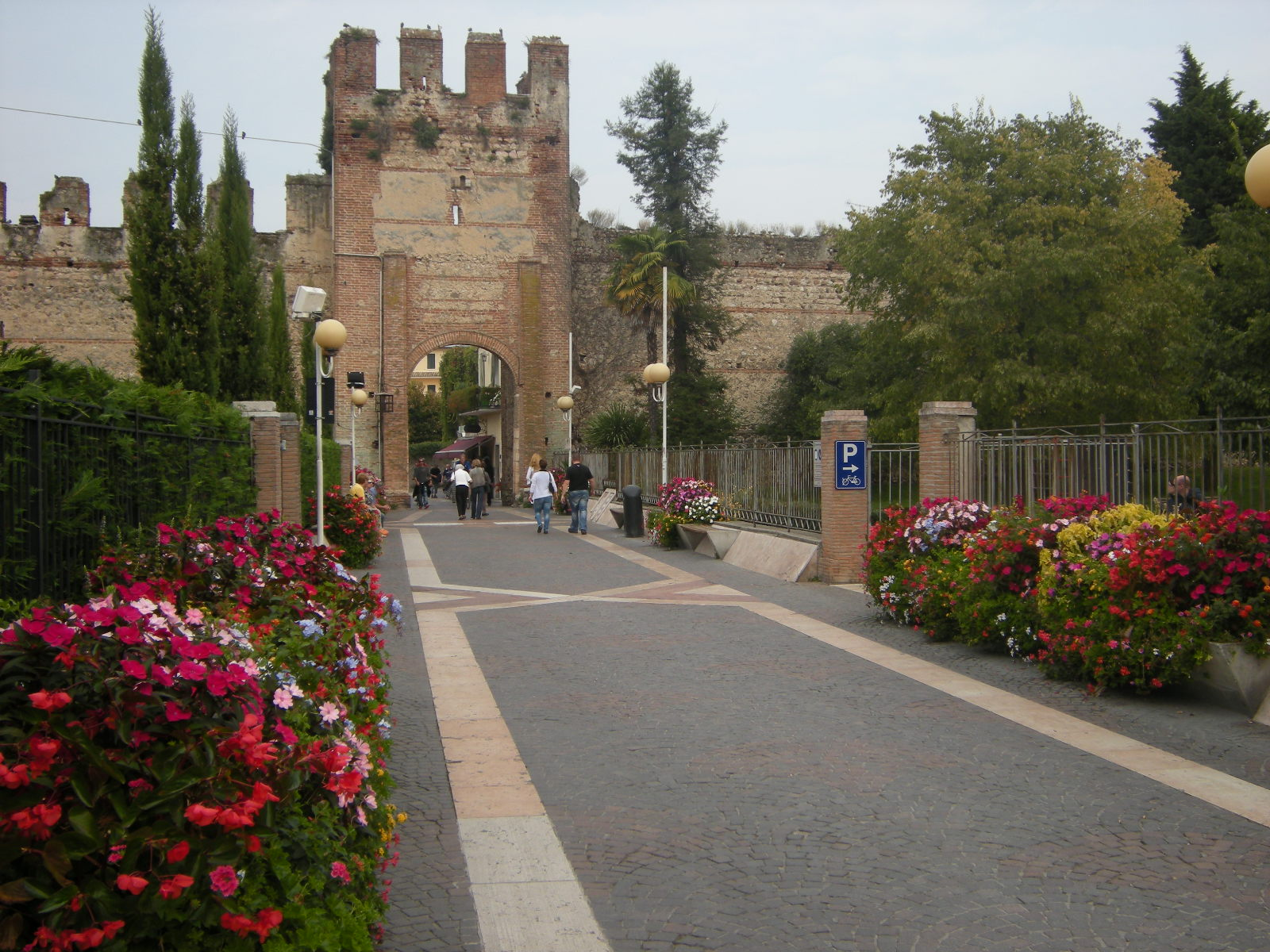
Gate of Lion of Saint Mark

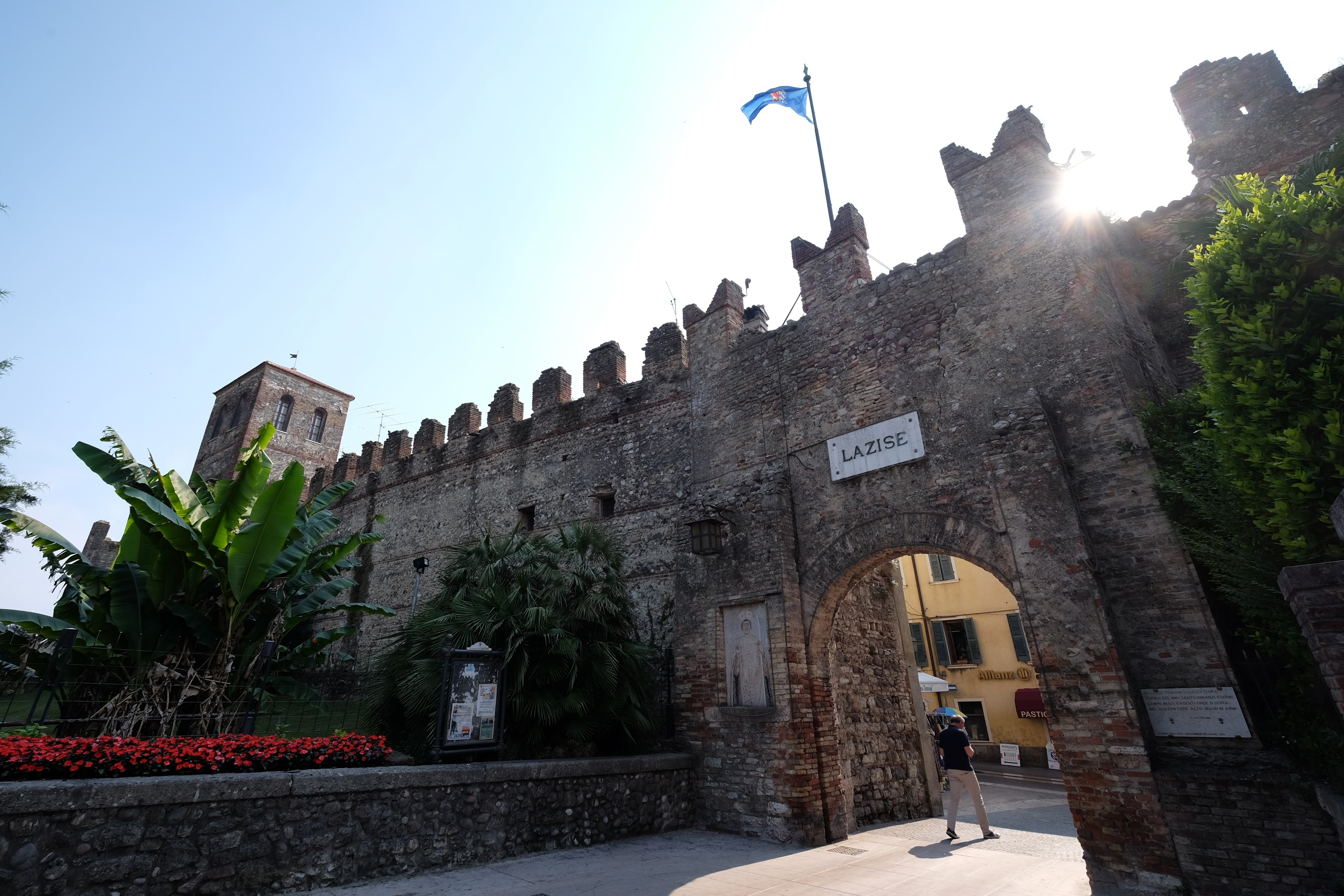
Medieval gate

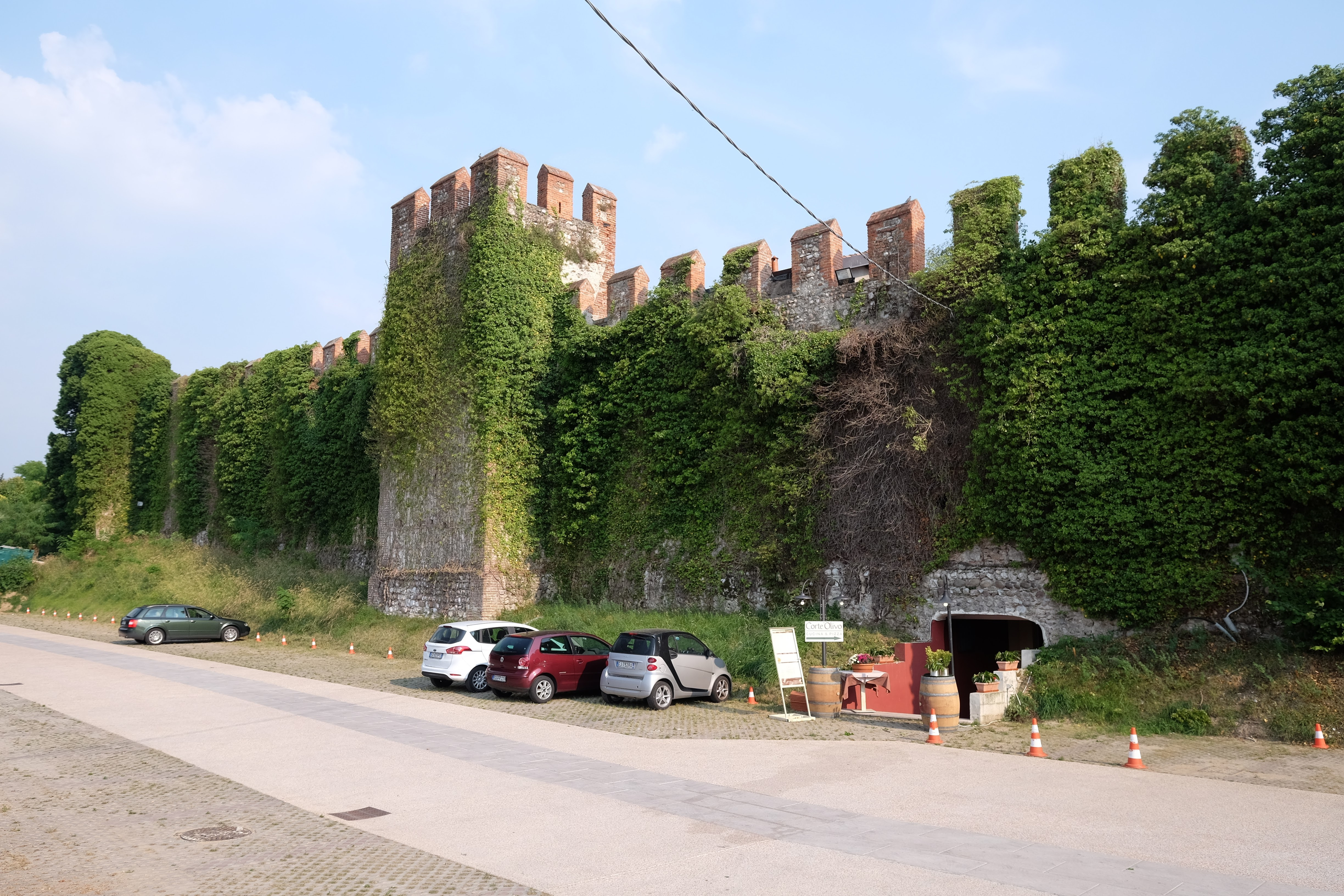

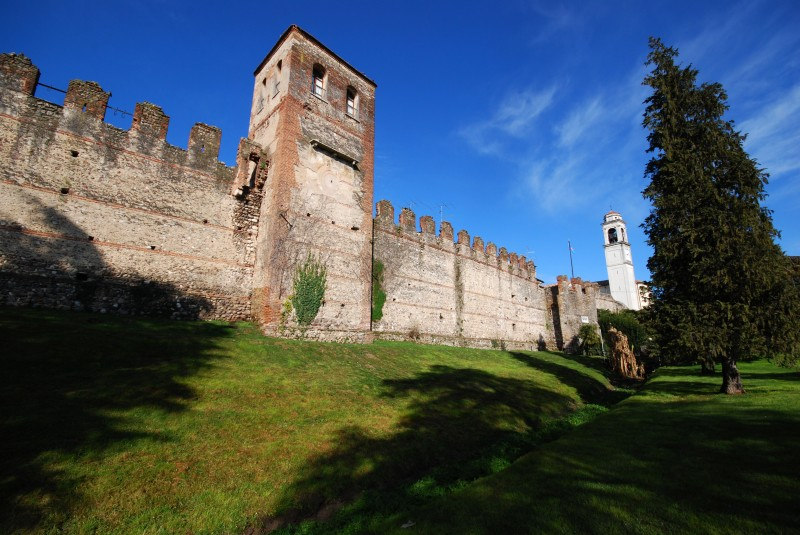

== Population ==
Historical population

Year	Pop.	±%
1861	?	—
1871	2,970	—
1881	3,034	+2.2%
1901	3,513	+15.8%
1911	4,045	+15.1%

Year	Pop.	±%
1921	4,397	+8.7%
1931	4,584	+4.3%
1936	4,596	+0.3%
1951	4,900	+6.6%
1961	5,012	+2.3%

Year	Pop.	±%
1971	5,336	+6.5%
1981	5,513	+3.3%
1991	5,490	−0.4%
2001	6,055	+10.3%

Source: Data from ISTAT

== Sister cities ==
Lazise is twinned with:

- Rosenheim, Germany
