= Maria of Calabria =

- Countess of Alba; Duchess of Durazzo; Countess of Avellino, Lady of Baux; Princess consort of Taranto and Achaea titular Latin Empress of Constantinople
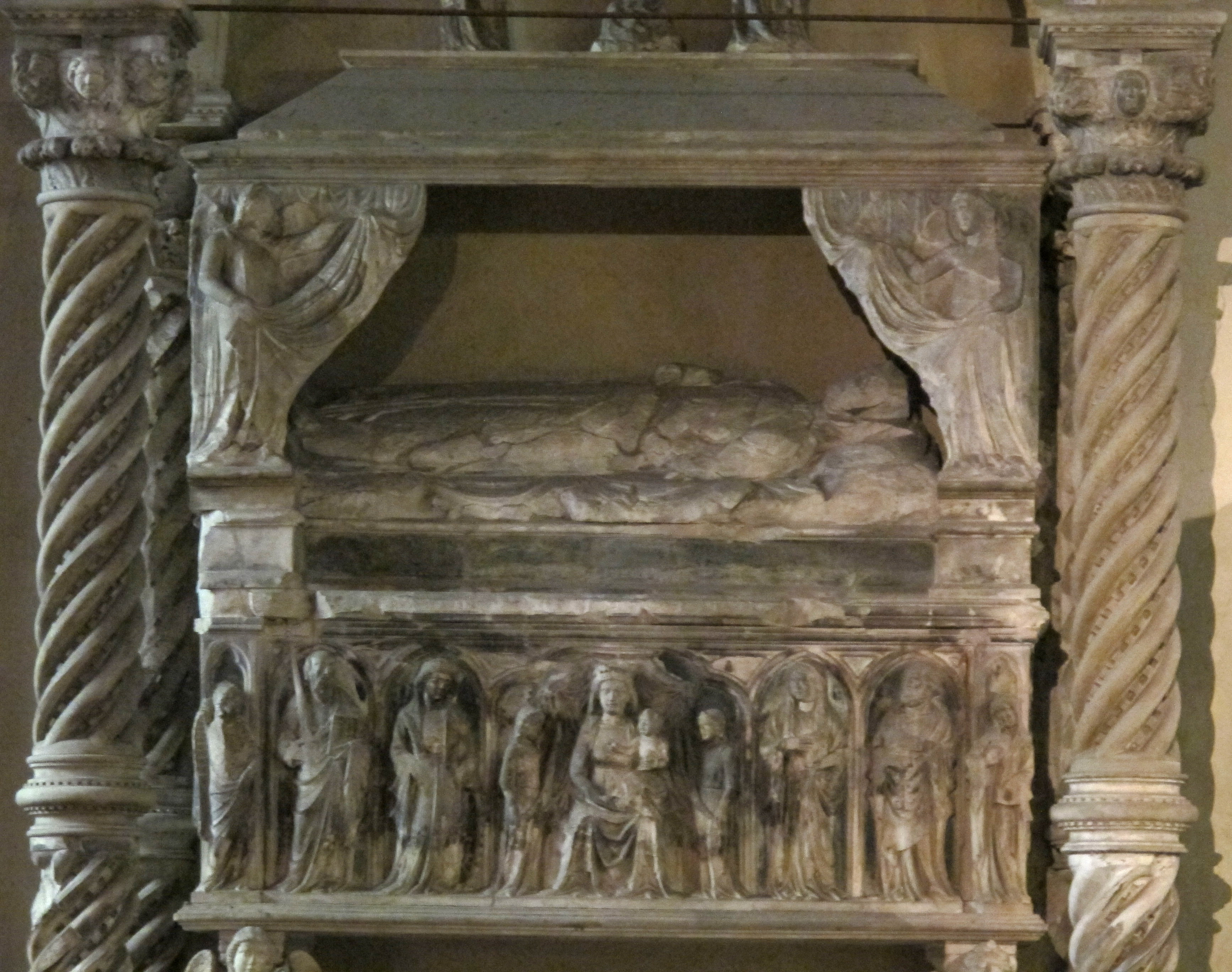
- Tomb in Santa Chiara, in Naples

Duchess of Durazzo
- Tenure: 1343–1348
- Predecessor: Agnes of Périgord
- Born: 6 May 1329
- Died: 20 May 1366 (aged 37)
- Burial: Santa Chiara Basilica
- Spouse: Charles, Duke of Durazzo (m. 1343; died 1348) Robert, Lord of Baux and Count of Avellino (m. 1350; died 1353) Philip II, Prince of Taranto (m. 1355)
- Issue: Joanna, Duchess of Durazzo; Agnes, Latin Empress; Margaret, Queen of Naples
- House: Anjou-Naples
- Father: Charles, Duke of Calabria
- Mother: Marie of Valois

Maria of Calabria (6 May 1329 – 20 May 1366), Countess of Alba, was a Neapolitan princess of the Capetian House of Anjou whose descendants inherited the crown of Naples following the death of her older sister, Queen Joanna I.

== Life ==
=== Early years ===
Maria was the fifth and posthumous child of Charles, Duke of Calabria (eldest son of King Robert of Naples) and Marie of Valois (half-sister of King Philip VI of France). She was born approximately six months following her father's death, on 9 November 1328. At the time of her birth, from her older three sisters and one brother, only her sister Joanna, born in March 1325, was alive. Two years later, on 23 October 1331, Maria's mother Marie of Valois died during a pilgrimage to Bari, leaving Maria and her older sister Joanna (now heiress of the throne of Naples) orphans. Both were raised at the court of their paternal grandfather King Robert in Naples.

By a bull dated on 30 June 1332, Pope John XXII officially decreed that Maria and her older sister would be married to the sons of the King Charles I of Hungary: Joanna was betrothed with Andrew of Hungary, while Maria was destined to his older brother and heir of the Hungarian throne, Louis I of Hungary; however, this engagement was conditioned that if Joanna died before her marriage could be consummated, then Maria would marry his younger brother Andrew. In this way, King Robert wanted to reconcile his bloodline with the descendants of his older brother, deprived from the crown of Naples in his favor.

Maria's grandfather died on 20 January 1343. By the provisions of his will, her elder sister Joanna was to become ruler of Naples, while Maria was not only given the County of Alba and a vast inheritance but also was confirmed to be betrothed to Louis I of Hungary, or in the case that this union never happened, the King of Naples instructed that she then could marry John, Duke of Normandy, heir of the French throne (although he was already married since 1332).

=== First marriage ===
However, shortly after the death of her grandfather King Robert, Maria was abducted by Agnes of Périgord, widow of John, Duke of Durazzo who arranged the marriage of Maria to her son, Charles, Duke of Durazzo. The marriage took place on 21 April 1343, the bride being almost fourteen years old and the groom twenty. They had five children:

- Louis of Durazzo (December 1343 – 14 January 1344)
- Joanna, Duchess of Durazzo (1344 – 20 July 1387); married firstly on 19 June 1366 to Infante Louis, Count of Beaumont (d. 1372), and secondly on 1376 to Robert IV of Artois, Count of Eu (d. 1387). There was no issue from either marriage.
- Agnes of Durazzo (1345 – 15 July 1388, Naples), married firstly on 6 June 1363 Cansignorio della Scala, Lord of Verona (d. 1375), and secondly on 1382 to James of Baux, Emperor of Constantinople (d. 1383). There was no issue from either marriage.
- Clementia of Durazzo (1346 – 1363, Naples)
- Margaret of Durazzo (28 July 1347 – 6 August 1412, Mela), married in January 1369 to Charles of Durazzo, Conte of Gravina and Morrone, who later became King of Naples and Hungary.

Maria and her husband Charles headed a faction opposing Maria's sister Queen Joanna of Naples and her second husband, Louis of Taranto. On 15 January 1348, Maria's husband was named Lieutenant General and Governor of the Kingdom of Naples. Charles apparently seeing an opportunity to claim power when the King and Queen of Naples had fled Naples in the face of an invasion by King Louis I of Hungary. He was however captured by the Hungarians only days later, near Aversa. On 23 January 1348, Maria's husband was decapitated in front of San Pietro a Maiella. His period of power had lasted less than a week. Maria thus became a nineteen-year-old widow.

=== Second marriage ===
With Charles dead, Maria fled Naples for Avignon. She sought refuge at the court of Pope Clement VI. In 1348, the Black Death reached the Italian Peninsula, forcing the King of Hungary and the majority of his army to retreat back to their homeland in hope of escaping the spreading epidemic. Maria returned to Naples and settled at the Castel dell'Ovo.

According to the Chronicle of Parthénope, the Neapolitan Princes, whom King Louis I of Hungary had imprisoned during his first campaign in Southern Italy, proposed him to marry Maria, his previous bride. During the siege of Aversa in the summer of 1350, the Hungarian King met her envoy in the nearby Trentola-Ducenta and the terms of their marriage were accepted. However, before the marriage could take place, she was abducted again, this time by Hugh IV, Count of Avellino and Lord of Baux, who forced Maria to marry with his eldest son and heir, Robert of Avellino. They had no children.

Count Hugh IV of Avellino was murdered on the orders of Maria's brother-in-law Louis of Taranto in 1351. Two years later (1353), Maria was finally rescued by King Louis I, however her husband Robert was captured and imprisoned by her brother-in-law at Castel dell'Ovo, where he was killed by Maria's orders. She reportedly witnessed the murder first hand.

=== Third marriage ===
Shortly after her second husband's death, Maria was again imprisoned, this time by her brother-in-law himself, Louis of Taranto, and was released only after her marriage in April 1355 to Philip II of Taranto, the younger brother of Louis. Maria and Philip had three sons who died young: Philip (1356), Charles (1358), and Philip (1360). They also had two stillborn sons, in 1362 and in 1366. In 1364, Philip succeeded as titular Latin Emperor of Constantinople and Prince of Achaea and Taranto on the death of his oldest brother, Robert II of Taranto, Emperor of Constantinople.

Due to her grandfather's will, Maria was the heiress to the Kingdom of Naples in the event that her elder sister Joanna I died childless. When Maria died in 1366, her claims passed to her three surviving daughters, of whom Charles of Durazzo –husband of her third daughter Margaret– eventually claimed the throne of Naples in 1382 as King Charles III after deposed and killed Joanna I. Maria died at age 37, probably from childbirth complications, and was buried at Santa Chiara Basilica, Naples.

== Notes ==
Titles in pretence
Preceded by Marie of Bourbon	— TITULAR — Latin Empress consort of Constantinople; 1364–1366; Reason for succession failure: Conquest by Empire of Nicaea in 1261	Succeeded by Elisabeth of Slavonia
