= Guglielmo della Scala =

Italian noble (1350–1404)

- Died: 1404
- Noble family: Scaliger
- Spouse: Onesta Mortone
- Father: Cangrande II della Scala
- Mother: Elizabeth of Bavaria

Guglielmo della Scala (English: William; died 1404) was Lord of Verona for the last ten days of his life. He assassinated his father Cangrande II della Scala in 1359, but was edged out of power by his uncle Cansignorio.

In 1404, together with his two sons Brunoro and Antonio II, he led a revolt against the Milanese. He was proclaimed Lord of Verona on 17 April, but was expelled from the city by the populace on 28 April. Francesco da Carrara, Lord of Padua, took over the city a few days later.

By his marriage to Onesta Mortone, Guglielmo left the two aforementioned sons, who never regained power in Verona, and three younger sons: Bartolomeo (died 21 March 1453), Fregnano (died 4 December 1443 at Vienna), Nicodemus, and Paul.

== Titles ==
Vacant Title last held by Antonio I	Lord of Verona; 1404	to the Carraresi
