= Scaliger =

Italian noble family

Scaligeri Scaligers Della Scala
- Patrician noble family
- Country: Lordship of Verona (present-day Italy)
- Founded: 1180
- Founder: Jacopino della Scala
- Final ruler: Antonio I della Scala
- Titles: Lord of Verona
- Motto: Nec descendere nec morari (broadly "he who hesitates is lost")
- Estates: Scaliger Palaces, Verona
- Dissolution: 17th century
- Deposition: 1387

The House of Della Scala, whose members were known as Scaligeri (Italian: [skaˈliːdʒeri]) or Scaligers (/ˈskælɪdʒərz/), was the ruling family of Verona and mainland Veneto (except for Venice) from 1262 to 1387, for a total of 125 years.

== History ==
=== Reign of the Scaligeri in Verona 1259 - 1387, 1404 ===
When Ezzelino III da Romano was elected podestà of the commune in 1226, he was able to convert the office into a permanent lordship. Upon his death in 1259 the Great Council elected as podestà del popolo Mastino I della Scala, who succeeded in converting the signoria (seigniory) into a family inheritance, governing at first with the acquiescence of the commune, then, when they failed to re-elect him in 1262, he effected a coup d'état and was acclaimed capitano del popolo ("people's captain"), at the head of the commune's troops. In 1277 Mastino was killed by a faction of the nobles. The reign of his brother, Alberto I della Scala as capitano (1277–1302) was an incessant war against the counts of San Bonifacio, who were aided by the House of Este. Of his three sons, Cangrande I della Scala inherited the podestà position in 1308, only the last shared the government (1308) and made a name as warrior, prince and patron of Dante, Petrarch and Giotto. By war or treaty he brought under his control the cities of Padua (1328), Treviso (1329), and Vicenza.

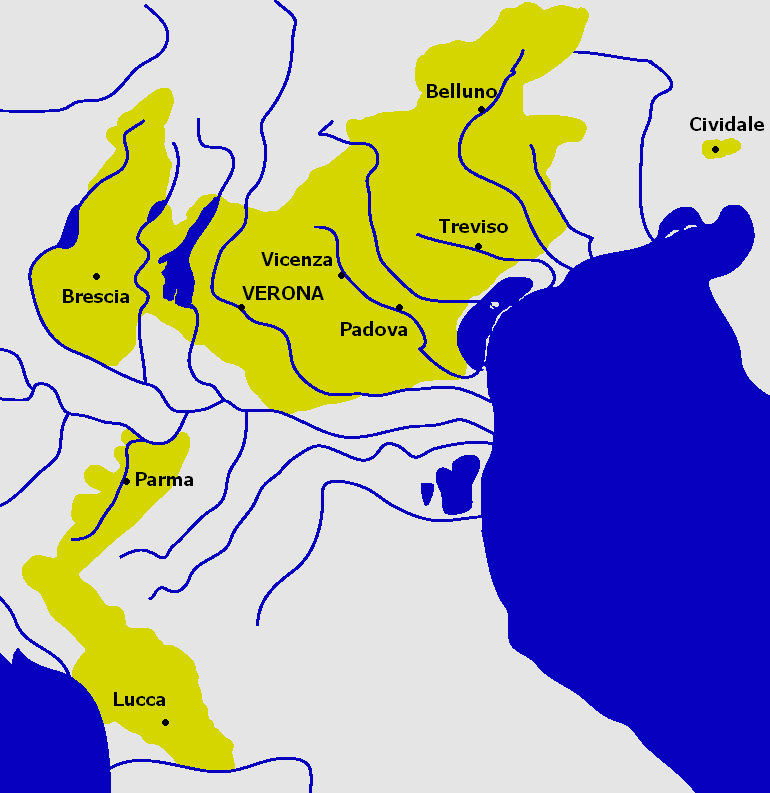
Territories held by the Scaligeri in 1336

Cangrande I was succeeded by his nephews Mastino II della Scala (1329–1351) and Alberto II della Scala. Mastino, the richest and most powerful prince of his generation in Italy, continued his uncle's policy, conquering Brescia in 1332 and carrying his power beyond the Po river. He purchased Parma (1335) and Lucca (1339). A powerful league was formed against him in 1337: Florence, Venice, the Visconti, the Este and the Gonzaga all joined, and after a three-year war, the Scaliger dominions were reduced to Verona and Vicenza.

Mastino II's son Cangrande II della Scala (1351–1359) was a cruel and suspicious tyrant; not trusting his own subjects, he surrounded himself with German mercenaries, but was killed by his brother Cansignorio della Scala (1359–1375), who beautified Verona with palaces, provided it with aqueducts and bridges and founded the state treasury. He also killed his other brother, Paolo Alboino della Scala. Fratricide among the Scaligeri continued when Antonio della Scala (1375–1387), Cansignorio's natural son, slew his brother Bartolomeo. This aroused the indignation of the people, who deserted him when Gian Galeazzo Visconti of Milan made war on him. Having exhausted all his resources, he fled from Verona at midnight (19 October 1387), thus ending the Scaliger domination.

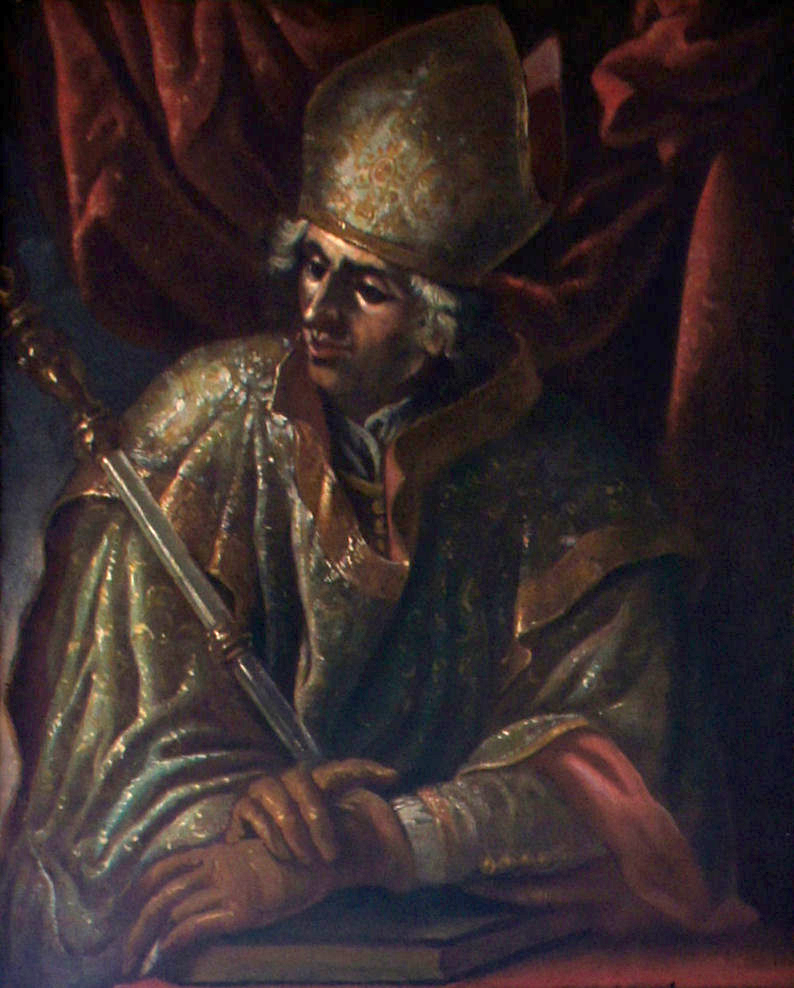
Nicodemo della Scala, portrait from the episcopal gallery of the Freising Cathedral

His son Canfrancesco della Scala attempted fruitlessly to recover Verona (1390) and is believed to have died in 1392. Guglielmo della Scala (died 1404), natural son of Cangrande II, was more fortunate: with the support of the people, he drove out the Milanese, but he died ten days thereafter, and Verona then submitted to Venice in the War of Padua (1405).

=== Later Scaligeri ===
The last representatives of the Scaligeri lived at the imperial court and repeatedly attempted to recover Verona by the aid of popular uprisings. After the Scaligeri had been ousted, two self-proclaimed members of the family, Giulio Cesare della Scala (also known as Julius Caesar Scaliger) and his son Joseph Justus Scaliger, made a reputation as humanist scholars, though their relationship to the historic Scaliger family is disputed. Guglielmo's sons dispersed widely: Brunoro went to Germany, while Nicodemo followed an ecclesiastical career, becoming Bishop of Freising; most of the siblings died and were buried in Vienna. Paolo married Amalia von Frauenberg and founded the Bavarian von der Leiter branch of the family, which survived until 1598.

=== Tombs ===
The church of Santa Maria Antica in Verona is surrounded with the tombs (arche) of the Scaligeri in the form of Gothic shrines, or tempietti, enclosing their sarcophagi: Cangrande della Scala is memorialized with an equestrian statue; Cansignorio by a marble Gothic monument by Bonino da Campione, 1374.

== Family tree of della Scala (Scaliger) ==
Arduino; DELLA SCALA
Balduino ∞ Caradina Gabrielli
Leonardo
Jacopino della Scala ∞ Elisa Superbi
Mastino I della Scala	Alberto I della Scala ∞ Verde of Salizzolo
Bartolomeo I della Scala ∞ Constance of Antioch	Alboino della Scala ∞ 1.Caterina Visconti; 2.Beatrice da Corregio	Cangrande I della Scala ∞ Giovanna di Svevia
(2) Alberto II della Scala	(2) Mastino II della Scala ∞ Taddea da Carrara
Cangrande II della Scala ∞ Elizabeth of Bavaria	Cansignorio della Scala ∞ Agnes of Durazzo	Paolo Alboino della Scala
(illeg.); Guglielmo della Scala ∞ Onesta Mortone	(illeg.); Antonio I della Scala ∞ Samaritana de Polena	(illeg.); Bartolomeo II della Scala
Antoinio II della Scala	Canfrancesco della Scala

== See also ==
- Zavarise
- Verona
- Veneto

== Sources ==
- Mennini Ippolito, Antonio (1986). "Della Scala". Lexikon des Mittelalters, III: Codex Wintoniensis bis Erziehungs- und Bildungswesen (in German). Stuttgart and Weimar: J. B. Metzler. col. 676–678. ISBN 3-7608-8903-4.
