= Lords of Verona =

The Lords of Verona ruled the city from 1260 until 19 October 1387 and for ten days in 1404. The lordship was created when Mastino I della Scala was raised to the rank of capitano del popolo from that of podestà. His descendants, the Scaliger, all Ghibellines, ruled the city and its vicinity as a hereditary seigniory for a century and a half, during which the city experienced its golden age.

| Signore | Rule | | Affiliation | Notes(s) |
|---|---|---|---|---|
| Mastino I della Scala | 7 October 1259 | 26 October 1277 | Ghibelline | Podestà of Verona; Elected signore in 1262 |
| Alberto I della Scala | 26 October 1277 | 3 September 1301 | Ghibelline | Former Podestà of Mantua; Brother of Mastino I First hereditary signore |
| Bartolomeo I della Scala | 3 September 1301 | 7 March 1304 | Ghibelline | Son of Alberto I |
| Alboino della Scala | 7 March 1304 | 29 November 1311 | Ghibelline | Son of Alberto I |
| Cangrande I della Scala | 29 November 1311 | 22 July 1339 | Ghibelline | Son of Alberto I Joint-lord with Alboino I (1308–1311) |
| Mastino II della Scala | 22 July 1339 | 3 June 1351 | Ghibelline | Son of Alboino I Joint-lord with Cangrande I (1329–1339) |
| Alberto II della Scala | 22 July 1339 | 3 June 1351 | Ghibelline | Son of Alboino I Joint-lord with Cangrande I (1329–1339) |
| Cangrande II della Scala | 3 June 1351 | 14 December 1359 | Ghibelline | Son of Mastino II; Son-in-law of Louis IV; Murdered by his brother Cansignorio |
| Cansignorio della Scala | 14 December 1359 | 18 October 1375 | Ghibelline | Son of Mastino II |
| Paolo Alboino della Scala | 14 December 1359 | 18 October 1375 | Ghibelline | Son of Mastino II; Murdered by Cansignorio in death bed |
| Bartolomeo II della Scala | 18 October 1375 | 12 July 1381 | Ghibelline | Natural son of Cansignorio; Murdered by his half-brother Antonio |
| Antonio I della Scala | 12 July 1381 | 19 October 1387 | Ghibelline | Son of Cansignorio; Deposed by pro-Milanese nobles Died in exile on 5 August 1388 (suspected being murdered by Visconti's envoys) |
| Gian Galeazzo Visconti | 20 October 1387 | 3 September 1402 | Ghibelline | Elected signore by pro-Milanese nobles also Lord of Milan |
| Gian Maria Visconti | 3 September 1402 | 8 April 1404 | Ghibelline | Son of Gian Galeazzo; Lacked of any authority over Verona; Deposed by anti-Visconti forces |
| Guglielmo della Scala | 8 April 1404 | 18 April 1404 | Guelph | Natural son of Cangrande II; Re-enthroned by anti-Visconti forces Murdered shortly after by his ally Francesco II da Carrara |
| Francesco II da Carrara | 18 April 1404 | 22 June 1405 | Guelph | Usurper of Gugliemo also Lord of Padua; Executed after the Venetian victory in the War of Padua |

== See also ==
- Timeline of Verona
