= Niccolò Acciaioli =

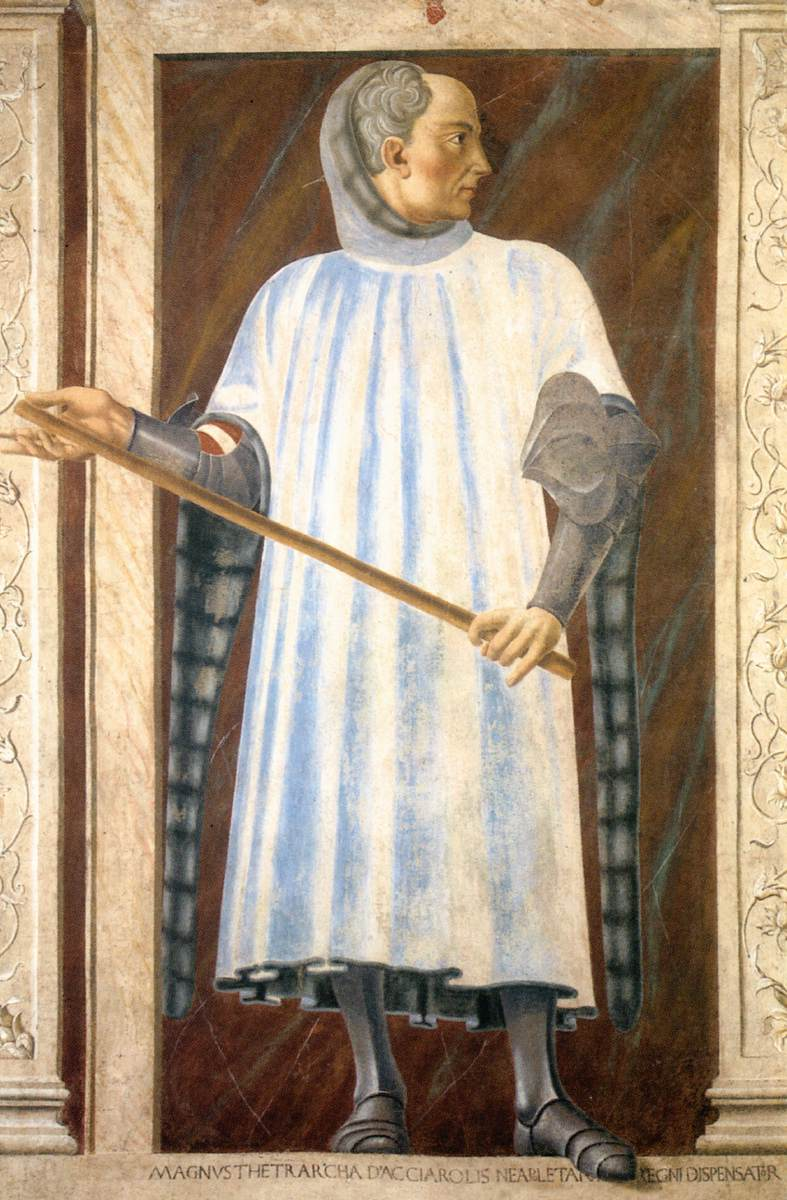
Fresco of Niccolò Acciaiuoli by Andrea del Castagno in the Uffizi.

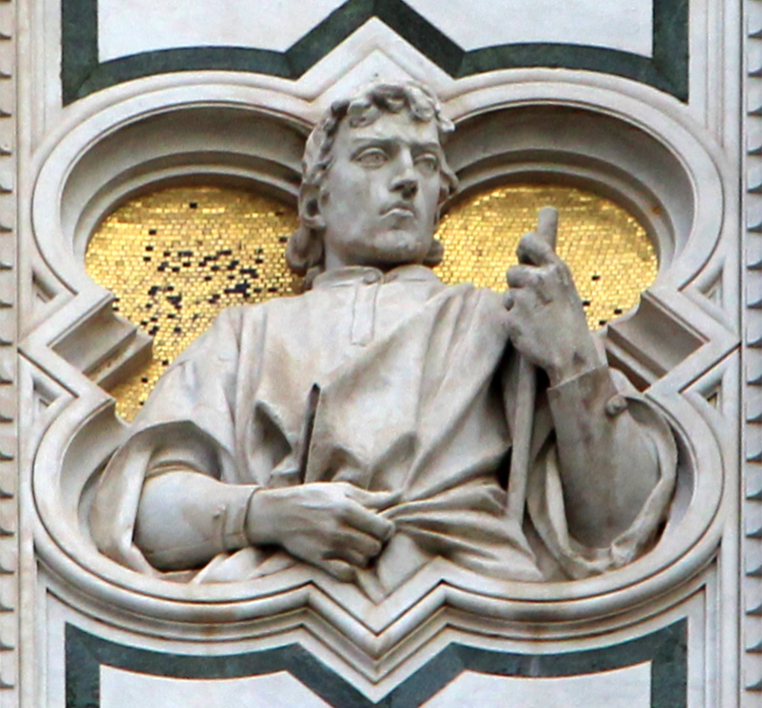
Niccolò Acciaiuoli, Santa Maria del Fiore, Florence

Niccolò Acciaioli or Acciaiuoli (1310 – 8 November 1365) was an Italian noble, a member of the Florentine banking family of the Acciaioli. He was the grand seneschal of the Kingdom of Naples and count of Melfi, Malta, and Gozo in the mid-fourteenth century. He was the son of Acciaiolo, a wealthy Florentine merchant. He had a sister by the name of Andrea Acciaioli.

== Life ==
Niccolò was sent to Naples by his father in 1331 to direct the family's banking interests and here, he rose in influence and power under King Robert and the exiled Empress Catherine II of Constantinople. The king made him a knight and gave him the title of Grand Seneschal. Likewise, Catherine and her children granted him and his family many estates in the Morea. It was said openly that Catherine and he were lovers. In 1345 the Acciaioli Bank collapsed and Niccolo's father Acciaiolo died shortly after. He assisted Catherine's son Louis of Taranto in reconquering the Principality of Achaea and, on 23 April 1358, he was appointed lord and castellan of Corinth and eight other fiefs in the remnant of the Latin Empire in Greece by the emperor Robert II. He was present at the marriage between Robert's daughter, Joan I, and Louis and after the latter's death (1362), he struggled against the rebellious barons who sought to overthrow Joan and supported Louis I of Hungary.

A lover of art and letters, he was a friend and protector of Petrarch and Boccaccio. In 1362, the latter was his guest at Naples. In a preserved letter he defended himself against the charges levelled at him by his opponents, giving unique insight into his character and that of 14th-century Italian politics. He left four sons: Lorenzino, Angelo, Lorenzo, and Benedetto. He was succeeded in his titles and holdings by his son Angelo, who made his cousins vicars of his Greek estates. He was buried in the Certosa del Galluzzo which he himself had built in Florence.

The famous Florentine writer and historian Matteo Palmieri wrote a biography of him, which was translated into Italian by Donato Acciaioli.

== Sources ==
- Setton, Kenneth M.; Hazard, Harry W., eds. (1975). A History of the Crusades, Volume III: The Fourteenth and Fifteenth Centuries. Madison and London: University of Wisconsin Press. ISBN 0-299-06670-3.
- Setton, Kenneth M. (1975). Catalan Domination of Athens 1311–1380. London: Variorum.
