= List of Crusader states =

The following is a list of crusader states that were independent during some point in history. This list includes crusader states in Outremer, Frankokratia, and in the Baltics.

== List ==
Crusader state	Conflict established in	Date established	Date disestablished
County of Edessa	First Crusade	1098	1144
Principality of Antioch	First Crusade	1098	1268
Kingdom of Jerusalem	First Crusade	1099	1291
County of Tripoli	First Crusade	1102	1289
Kingdom of Cyprus	Third Crusade	1192	1489
Latin Empire	Fourth Crusade	1204	1261
Kingdom of Thessalonica	Fourth Crusade	1204	1224
Principality of Achaea (Note: After the fall of the Latin Empire in 1261, Achaea refused to become a Byzantine vassal, and came under the suzerainty of the Angevins, although they recognized the Latin Emperors in exile as their rulers until the death of James of Baux in 1383. The title was also held by several titular Latin Emperors.)	Fourth Crusade	1205	1432
Duchy of the Archipelago (Note: The duchy recognized the Latin Empire's authority until the latter's collapse in 1261.)	Fourth Crusade	1207	1579
Terra Mariana	Livonian Crusade	1207	1561
State of the Teutonic Order	Northern Crusades	1226	1525
Hospitaller Rhodes	Hospitaller conquest of Rhodes	1310	1522
