= Catherine of Valois-Courtenay =

Titular Latin empress from 1307 to 1346

Catherine
- Princess consort of Taranto; Princess consort of Achaea
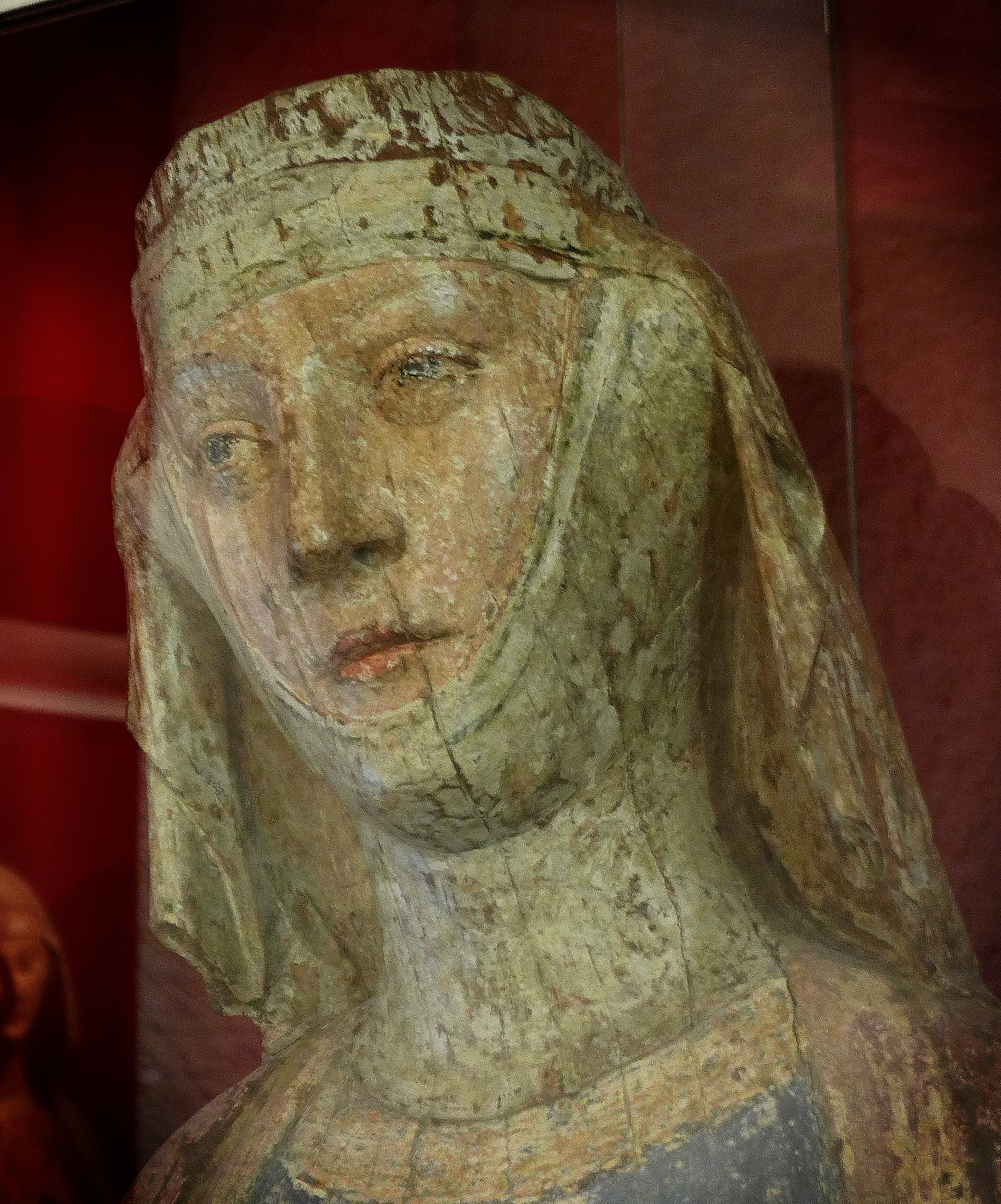
- Born: Before 15 April 1303
- Died: October 1346 (aged 42-43); Naples
- Spouse: Philip I, Prince of Taranto (m. 1313; died 1331)
- Issue: Margaret, Duchess of Andria; Robert, Prince of Taranto; Louis I, King of Naples; Philip II, Prince of Taranto
- House: Valois
- Father: Charles, Count of Valois
- Mother: Catherine of Courtenay

Catherine II, also Catherine of Valois or Catherine of Taranto (before 15 April 1303 – October 1346), was the recognised Latin empress of Constantinople from 1307 to 1346, although she lived in exile and only had authority over Crusader states in Greece. She was also princess consort of Achaea and Taranto, as well as regent of Achaea from 1332 to 1341 and governor of Cephalonia from 1341 to 1346.

== Life ==
Catherine was born in 1303, sometime before 15 April, the eldest daughter of Count Charles of Valois and Catherine of Courtenay. Her mother was recognized as empress of the Latin Empire of Constantinople by the Latin states in Greece, despite the city having been captured by the Empire of Nicaea in 1261. Catherine inherited her claims as the titular empress on 11 October 1307. She was still a child and remained in the custody of her father, who managed her claims to the empire until his death in 1325.

An early betrothal to Hugh of Burgundy, made 15 April 1303 when Catherine was an infant, was renounced in 1312.

=== Naples ===
In July 1313, Catherine married Philip I of Taranto, King of Albania and Prince of Achaea, who was the younger brother of Robert, King of Naples. She associated her husband as titular emperor (Philip II), and retained the claim to the empire after his death on 23 December 1332. Robert, his eldest surviving son, succeeded him as Prince of Taranto in 1331. Catherine became influential at the court of Naples. Her court was more worldly than the pious court of King Robert and his pious wife, Sancha of Majorca. During the reign of her niece, Joanna I of Naples, she opposed the marriage of Joan's younger sister, Maria of Calabria, to Charles, Duke of Durazzo. This was because Maria was heir presumptive to the throne of Naples, and the Durazzos were rivals to her own family. Catherine and her family were compensated with a cash settlement from the royal treasury.

=== Achaea ===
In 1333, Catherine's son Robert received the Principality of Achaea through an agreement with his uncle, John of Gravina. However, the thirteen-year-old boy was deemed too young to reign alone, and his mother became his co-ruler for the rest of her life. Initially ruling through appointed baillis, in summer 1338 Catherine mustered a fleet and took her whole household to Achaea, where she took an active part in its government. She gave refuge to Nikephoros II Orsini of Epirus, and supported him in his attempt to assert himself in his land against the Byzantine Emperor Andronikos III Palaiologos.

=== Final years ===
Catherine's presence in Achaea was no longer needed by the time Robert reached adulthood in 1341. She became Governor of Cephalonia and spent the last five years of her life in this responsibility. After the murder of Joan's husband, Andrew of Hungary, Joan sought a new husband amongst her Taranto cousins. Catherine supported her younger son, Louis of Taranto, against her older son, Robert. She sheltered Charles of Artois, a bastard son of Robert the Wise, and his son Bertrand, who were both suspected of complicity. When asked to give them up, she refused and stated she would punish them herself if they were guilty.

Catherine died in Naples in October 1346. Queen Joan organized her funeral at the church of San Domenico.

== Issue ==
Catherine and Philip I of Taranto had:

- Margaret (c. 1325–1380), married Francis of Baux, Duke of Andria. By Francis, she was the mother of James of Baux, Prince of Achaea and titular Emperor of Constantinople.
- Robert (1326–1364), Prince of Taranto, titular Emperor of Constantinople (as Robert II).
- Louis (1327/28–1362), Prince of Taranto and King of Naples by right of his wife.
- Philip II (1329–1374), Prince of Taranto and Achaea, titular Emperor of Constantinople (as Philip III).

== Sources ==
- Jackson-Laufer, Guida Myrl (1999). Women Rulers Throughout the Ages: An Illustrated Guide. ABC-CLIO.
- Richardson, Douglas (2011). Plantagenet Ancestry: Plantagenet Ancestry: A Study In Colonial And Medieval Families (2nd ed.).
- Setton, Kenneth M.; Hazard, Harry W., eds. (1975). A History of the Crusades, Volume III: The Fourteenth and Fifteenth Centuries. Vol. 3. Madison and London: University of Wisconsin Press. ISBN 0-299-06670-3.
- Setton, Kenneth Meyer (1976). The Papacy and the Levant, 1204-1571. Vol. I: The Thirteenth and Fourteenth Centuries. The American Philosophical Society.

Catherine of Valois-Courtenay House of Valois Cadet branch of the Capetian dynasty Born: Before 15 April 1303 Died: October 1346
Titles in pretence
Preceded by Catherine I and Charles	— TITULAR — Latin Empress of Constantinople; 1307–1346 with Philip II (1313–1332)	Succeeded by Robert II
Royal titles
Preceded by Thamar Angelina Komnene	Queen consort of Albania; 1313–1331	Succeeded by Agnes of Périgord as Duchess of Durazzo
