= Canfrancesco della Scala =

Italian nobleman (14th century)

- Died: 1392
- Noble family: Scaliger
- Father: Antonio I della Scala
- Mother: Samaritana da Polena

Canfrancesco della Scala was the son of Antonio I della Scala. In 1387, when his father was defeated by the Visconti of Milan and fled to Ravenna, Canfrancesco remained behind and prepared to resist. However, his efforts failed, and he soon joined his father in exile in Ravenna. He tried to retake Verona in 1390. He is believed to have died in 1392, possibly due to poison.
