= Philip II of Taranto =

Titular Latin Emperor from 1364 to 1373

Philip II

Prince of Achaea
- Reign: 1364–1373
- Predecessor: Robert
- Successor: Joanna

Latin Emperor of Constantinople (titular)
- Born: 1329
- Died: 25 November 1373 (aged 43–44); Taranto
- Spouse: Maria of Calabria; Elizabeth of Slavonia
- House: Capetian House of Anjou
- Father: Philip I of Taranto
- Mother: Catherine of Valois-Courtenay

Coat of arms of Philip II of Taranto, the same as his brother Louis I of Naples. They are the combination of the arms of Anjou and those of the Latin Empire of Constantinople.

Philip II (1329 – 25 November 1373) of the Angevin house, was Prince of Achaea and Taranto, as well as titular Latin Emperor of Constantinople as Philip III, from 1364 to his death in 1373.

He was the son of Prince Philip I of Taranto and Catherine II, Latin Empress. Upon the execution of his cousin Charles, Duke of Durazzo, in 1348, he succeeded as lord of the Kingdom of Albania. Shortly after, his older brother Louis married their first cousin, Joanna I of Naples, and became king. In April 1355, Philip married Joanna's younger sister, Maria of Calabria.

In 1364, Philip succeeded as titular Latin Emperor of Constantinople and Prince of Achaea and Taranto on the death of his oldest brother, Robert.

Maria died in 1366. On 20 October 1370, Philip married yet another Angevin, Elizabeth of Slavonia, former heir presumptive to the throne of Hungary. He died on 25 November 1373 in Taranto.

All his children had died young. His heir was his sister's son James of Baux.

He had several illegitimate children.

== Family ==
By his first wife, Maria of Calabria, Philip had three short-lived sons: Philip (1356), Charles (1358), Philip (1360). They also had two stillborn children, in 1362 and 1366. By his second wife, Elisabeth of Slavonia, Philip had a son named Philip (1371).

== Bibliography ==
- Giornale araldico-genealogico-diplomatico dell'Accademia araldica italiana. Vol. 4. Pisa: La direzione del giornale araldico. 1877.
- Giuseppe Pupillo; Operatori C.R.S.E.C. BA/7 (2017). Altamura, immagini e descrizioni storiche (PDF). Matera: Antezza Tipografi. ISBN 9788889313282. Archived from the original (PDF) on 21 October 2018.
- Musto, Ronald G. (2003). Apocalypse in Rome: Cola di Rienzo and the Politics of the New Age. University of California Press.

== Sources ==
- Nicol, Donald M. (1984). The Despotate of Epiros, 1267-1479. Cambridge University Press.

Philip II of Taranto House of Anjou-Taranto Cadet branch of the Capetian House of Anjou Born: 1329 Died: 25 November 1373
Preceded by Robert of Taranto	Prince of Achaea; 1364–1373	Succeeded by Joan I of Naples
Preceded by Robert of Taranto	— TITULAR — Latin Emperor of Constantinople; 1364–1373	Succeeded by James of Baux
Preceded by Louis I of Naples	Prince of Taranto; 1364–1373	Succeeded by James of Baux
