= Andrea Acciaioli =

Italian noblewoman

Andrea Acciaioli or Acciaiuoli was an Italian noblewoman, as the Countess of Altavilla in the 14th century. Born in Florence, she was known through her brother to Giovanni Boccaccio, and was the person to whom he dedicated his book On Famous Women.

== Life ==
Andrea was the sister of Niccolò Acciaioli, the daughter of Acciaiolo, a wealthy Florentine merchant connected to the Acciaioli family of Florence. Her family was an important family of Italy from the twelfth century and associated with banking. She was a member of the court of Joanna, Queen of Naples.

Her first husband was Carlo d'Arto, Count of Monteodorisio, who died in 1346. Sometime after 1358 and before 1362 she then married Bartolomeo II of Capua, Count of Altavilla. She was described as being of strong character, educated, and having elegant speech.

== Sources ==
- Boccaccio, Giovanni (2001). Famous Women. Translated by Brown, Virginia. Harvard University Press. ISBN 0-674-01130-9.
