= Philip I of Taranto =

Titular Latin Emperor from 1313 to 1331

Philip I
- Prince of Taranto; Prince of Achaea; King of Albania; Despot of Romania; Emperor and Autocrat of the Romans
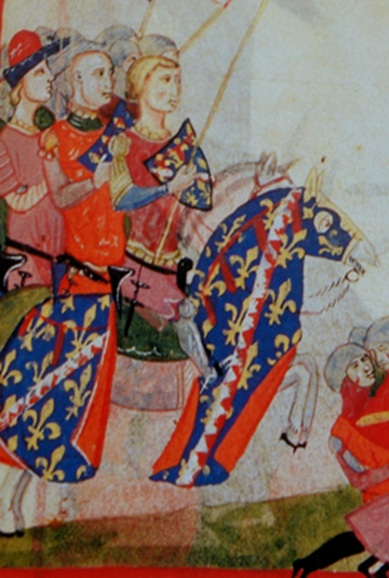
- Philip in the Battle of Montecatini (1315)
- Born: 10 November 1278
- Died: 1331/2
- Spouses: Thamar Angelina Komnene; Catherine II, Latin Empress
- Issue: Charles, Vicar of Romania; Jeanne, Queen of Armenia; Philip, Despot of Romania; Maria, Abbess of Conversano; Beatrice, Countess of Brienne; Bianca, Infanta of Aragon; Margaret, Duchess of Andria; Robert of Taranto; Louis I, King of Naples; Philip II of Taranto
- House: Anjou-Sicily; Anjou-Taranto (founder)
- Father: Charles II of Naples
- Mother: Maria of Hungary

Philip I (10 November 1278 – 26 December 1331) was the lord of the Kingdom of Albania and prince of Achaea and Taranto. He also held the title despot of Romania and claimed the Latin Empire of Constantinople as Philip II by marriage to Catherine of Valois.

Born in Naples, Philip was a younger son of King Charles II of Naples and Maria of Hungary.

== First marriage ==
On 4 February 1294, his father named him Prince of Taranto at Aix-en-Provence, and on 12 July 1294, Vicar-General of the Kingdom of Sicily. These dignities were a prelude to Charles' plan to bestow upon Philip an empire east of the Adriatic. The day he was invested as Vicar-General, he married by proxy Thamar Angelina Komnene, daughter of Nikephoros I Komnenos Doukas, Despot of Epirus. Threatened by the Byzantine Empire, Nikephoros had decided to seek Angevin patronage, and agreed to the marriage of Thamar and Philip. The two were married in person on 13 August 1294 at L'Aquila. Upon their marriage, Charles ceded to Philip the suzerainty of Achaea and the Kingdom of Albania, and all his rights to the Latin Empire and the Lordship of Vlachia. Nikephoros gave, as his daughter's dowry, the fortresses of Vonitsa, Vrachova, Gjirokastër and Naupactus, in the territory of Aetolia, to Philip, and agreed to settle the succession, on his death, upon his daughter rather than his son Thomas. Upon the death of Nikephoros (c. 1297), Philip took the title of "Despot of Romania", claiming Epirus, Aetolia, Acarnania, and Great Vlachia. However, Nikephoros' Byzantine widow, Anna Kantakouzene, had Thomas proclaimed Despot of Epirus and assumed the regency.

== War of the Vespers ==
As Vicar-General of Sicily, he was part of the invasion of that island during the latter stage of the War of the Sicilian Vespers. His army was defeated in 1299 at the Battle of Falconara by Frederick III of Sicily, and he was held prisoner until the signing of the Treaty of Caltabellotta in 1302.

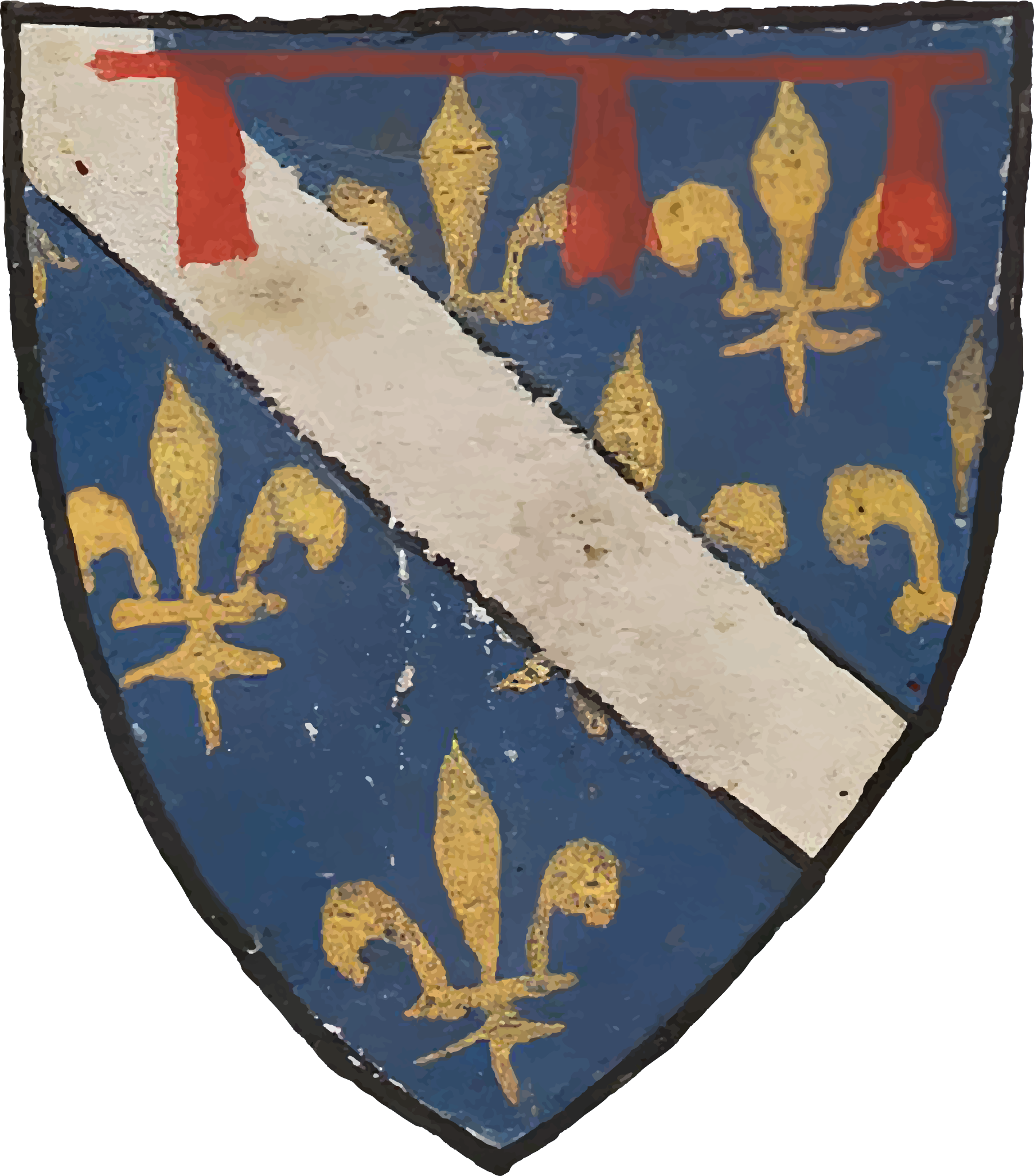
Coat of arms of Philip I of Taranto before marrying Catherine of Valois

== Balkan adventure ==
In 1306, Philip of Savoy and Isabella of Villehardouin, the Prince and Princess of Achaea, visited Charles' court in Naples. Philip of Savoy was accused of disloyalty and failure to support Charles in a campaign against Epirus. As Isabelle had not sought her suzerain's consent before marrying him, Charles deprived the two of Achaea and bestowed it directly upon Philip of Taranto on 5 May 1306. He made his only personal visit to Achaea shortly thereafter, accepting the homage of his vassals at Glarentza, and carrying out an unsuccessful campaign against the Despotate of Epirus. He left Guy II, Duke of Athens, as his bailli in Achaea. Meanwhile, Philip and Isabella relinquished their claims on Achaea on 11 May 1307 in exchange for the County of Alba.

== Second marriage ==
Coat of arms of Philip I of Taranto, after his wedding with Catherine of Valois: his personal arms (Anjou defaced with a bend), impaled with the arms of the Latin Empire of Constantinople.

In 1309, Philip accused Thamar of adultery, probably on a falsified charge. This freed him to take part in a complex marital pact. Catherine of Valois, the titular Latin Empress, had been betrothed to Hugh V, Duke of Burgundy, titular King of Thessalonica. This engagement was broken, and she married Philip on 29 July 1313, at Fontainebleau. In exchange, her maternal lands of Courtenay and other estates on the Continent were ceded to Hugh's sister Joan the Lame, who married Catherine's half-brother, Philip of Valois. Hugh V was betrothed to Joan of France, later Countess of Burgundy and Artois. (Hugh died before in 1315 before the marriage could be solemnized; Joan of France married Hugh's brother and successor Odo IV, Duke of Burgundy instead.) Philip ceded the Principality of Achaea (over which he retained suzerainty) to Matilda of Hainaut, who married Hugh's brother Louis of Burgundy on 29 July 1313. This donation was rather restricted: should the couple die without heirs, the Principality was to revert to the house of Burgundy, while Matilda enjoyed the usufruct for life. Nor could Matilda marry again without her suzerain's permission. To complete the separation of Eastern and Western claims, Hugh ceded his rights to Thessalonica to Louis, while Louis renounced his claims on his parents' inheritance in favor of Hugh. The engagement of Philip's eldest son Charles of Taranto to Matilda of Hainault was broken off, and he was engaged to Jeanne de Valois, younger sister of Catherine of Valois; his father also ceded to him the title of Despot of Romania and the claims thereto appertaining.

== Guelph-Ghibelline War ==
In 1315, Philip was sent by his brother Robert of Naples to lead an army relieving the Florentines, who were threatened by the Pisans under Uguccione della Faggiuola. The Florentine-Neapolitan army was badly beaten at the Battle of Montecatini on 29 August 1315; Philip's younger brother Peter, Count of Gravina and his son Charles of Taranto were both killed.

== Frankish Greece ==
The death of Louis of Burgundy without heirs in 1316 upset the Angevin plans for Achaea. Matilda was invited to marry John of Gravina, Philip's younger brother, by their elder brother, Robert of Naples. When she declined, she was kidnapped and brought to Naples. By long persuasion and threats, she was compelled in 1318 to consent to the marriage, whereupon Frederick Trogisio was sent to Achaea as a new baili. In 1320, Eudes IV, Duke of Burgundy, after several protests, agreed to sell his rights to Achaea and Thessalonica to Louis, Count of Clermont for 40,000 livres. However, Philip, financed by Philip V of France, bought the claims for the same sum in 1321. In the meantime, the refractory Matilda of Hainaut was brought before the Papal court in Avignon, where she revealed that she had secretly married the Burgundian knight Hugh de La Palice. Her marriage with John was annulled on the grounds of non-consummation, but the revelation of her secret marriage again furnished a pretext for the confiscation of Achaea by the Angevins. It was, of course, bestowed directly upon John of Gravina, in exchange for 40,000 livres, the price paid to the Duke of Burgundy. Matilda spent the rest of her unfortunate life as a prisoner of the Neapolitan state, to prevent the resurgence of her claim.

Philip continued to plot the recovery of the Latin Empire, making an alliance in 1318 with his nephew Charles I of Hungary for that purpose, but to no effect. In 1330, the last of his sons by his first marriage died, returning to him the title of Despot of Romania. All his rights and titles passed on his death two years later to his eldest son by his second marriage, Robert of Taranto.

== Family ==
Children of his first marriage (1294), with Thamar Angelina Komnene, which ended with a divorce (1309):

- Charles (1296–1315), Vicar of Romania, killed at the Battle of Montecatini
- Jeanne (1297–1323), married to Oshin of Armenia and then Oshin of Korikos.
- Philip (1300–1330), Despot of Romania.
- Maria (1302/04–1368), Abbess of Conversano.
- Beatrice (1305–1340), married to Walter VI of Brienne, titular Duke of Athens.
- Bianca (1309–1337), married to Infante Ramón Berenguer of Aragon, Count of Prades.

Children of his second marriage (1313), with Catherine of Valois:

- Margaret (c. 1325–1380), married Francis of Baux, Duke of Andria. By Francis, she was the mother of James of Baux, Prince of Achaea and titular Emperor of Constantinople.
- Robert (1326–1364), Prince of Taranto, titular Emperor of Constantinople (as Robert II).
- Louis (1327/28–1362), Prince of Taranto and King of Naples by right of his wife.
- Philip II (1329–1374), Prince of Taranto and Achaea, titular Emperor of Constantinople (as Philip III).

== See also ==
- History of Francavilla Fontana

== Sources ==
- Armstrong, Edward (1932). "Italy in the Time of Dante". In Gwatkin, Henry Melvill; Whitney, James Pounder; Tanner, Joseph Robson; Previté-Orton, Charles William; Brooke, Zachary Nugent (eds.). The Cambridge Medieval History. Vol. 7: Decline of Empire and Papacy. Cambridge University Press.
- Geanakoplos, Deno (1975). "Byzantium and the Crusades, 1354–1453". In Setton, Kenneth M.; Hazard, Harry W. (eds.). A History of the Crusades, Volume III: The Fourteenth and Fifteenth Centuries. Vol. 3. Madison and London: University of Wisconsin Press. pp. 27–68. ISBN 0-299-06670-3.
- Nicol, Donald M. (1984). The Despotate of Epiros 1267-1479: A Contribution to the History of Greece in the Middle Ages. Cambridge University Press. ISBN 9780521261906.
- Nicol, Donald M. (1994). The Byzantine Lady: Ten Portraits, 1250–1500. Cambridge and New York: Cambridge University Press. ISBN 0-521-45531-6.
- Richardson, Douglas (2011). Plantagenet Ancestry: Plantagenet Ancestry: A Study In Colonial And Medieval Families (2nd ed.).
- Shawcross, Teresa (2009). The Chronicle of Morea: Historiography in Crusader Greece. Oxford University Press.
- Stanton, Charles D (2015). Medieval Maritime Warfare. Pen & Sword.
- Todt, K.-P. (1993). "Ph. v. Tarent". Lexikon des Mittelalters (in German). Vol. VI: Lukasbilder bis Plantagenêt. Stuttgart and Weimar: J. B. Metzler.
- Topping, Peter (1975). "The Morea, 1311–1364". In Setton, Kenneth M.; Hazard, Harry W. (eds.). A History of the Crusades, Volume III: The Fourteenth and Fifteenth Centuries. Vol. 3. Madison and London: University of Wisconsin Press. pp. 104–140. ISBN 0-299-06670-3.
- Tsougarakis, Nickiphoros I.; Lock, Peter, eds. (2014). A Companion to Latin Greece. Brill's Companions to European History. Leiden and New York: BRILL. ISBN 978-90-0-4284104.
- Zacour, Norman P. (1960). "Talleyrand: The Cardinal of Périgord (1301-1364)". Transactions of the American Philosophical Society. New Series. 50 (7). American Philosophical Society: 1–83. doi:10.2307/1005798. JSTOR 1005798.

Regnal titles
| Preceded by Charles II | Prince of Taranto; Lord of the Kingdom of Albania; 1294–1331 | Succeeded by Robert |
| Preceded by Isabella | Prince of Achaea; 1307–1313 | Succeeded by Matilda |
Titles in pretence
| Preceded by Catherine II | — TITULAR — Latin Emperor; 1313–1331; With: Catherine II | Succeeded by Catherine II |
