= Agnes of Durazzo =

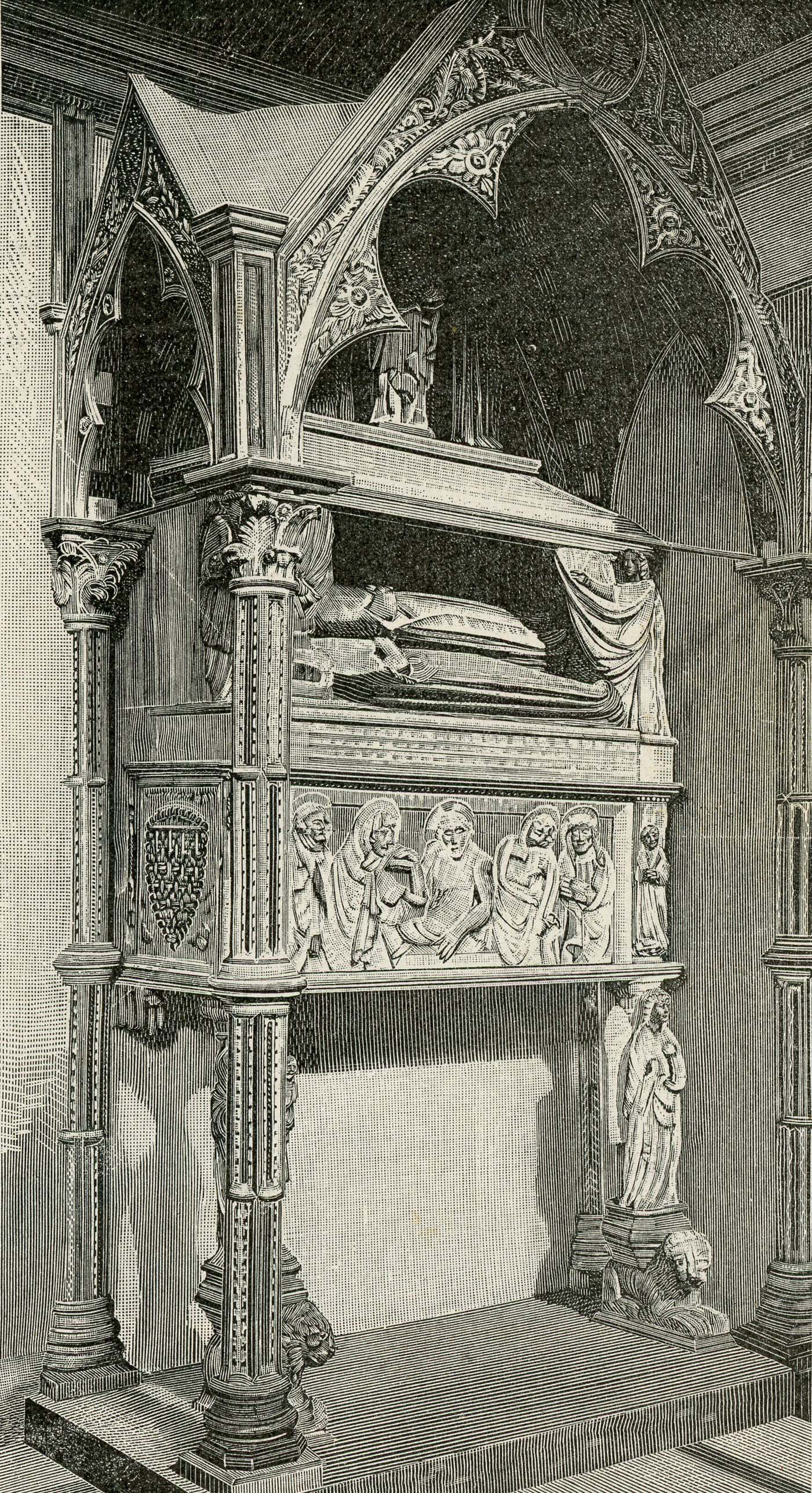
- Tomb of Agnes and Clementia, church of St. Chiara in Naples.

Latin Empress consort of Constantinople
- Tenure: 1382—1383
- Born: 1345; Durazzo, Albania
- Died: 10 February 1383 (aged 37–38)
- Spouses: Cansignorio della Scala (died 1375) James of Baux (m. 1382; died 1383)
- Father: Charles of Durazzo
- Mother: Maria of Calabria

Agnes of Durazzo (1345 – 10 February 1383) was the wife of James of Baux, titular Latin Emperor of Constantinople. She was the last woman to claim the title of empress of the Latin Empire.

Agnes was the second daughter of Charles, Duke of Durazzo and Maria of Calabria. She first married Cansignorio della Scala. Cansignorio was a younger brother and nominal co-ruler of Cangrande II della Scala, Lord of Verona. In 1359, Cansignorio assassinated his older brother and succeeded him. His younger brother Paolo Alboino della Scala became his co-ruler until 1365. On 10 October 1375, Cansignorio died, presumed to have been poisoned. Their marriage was childless.

On 16 September 1382, Agnes married by proxy to her second husband, James of Baux. He was the claimant to the throne of the Latin Empire since 1374. Her brother-in-law, Charles III of Naples, granted her Corfu as part of her dowry. Their marriage was short-lived. Agnes died 10 February 1383. James died in Taranto on 7 July 1383.

== Sources ==
- Setton, Kenneth M. (1953). "Archbishop Pierre d'Ameil in Naples and the Affair of Aimon III of Geneva (1363-1364)". Speculum. 28 (4 Oct). The University of Chicago Press. doi:10.2307/2849199. JSTOR 2849199. S2CID 161444650.
- Topping, Peter (1975). "The Morea, 1364–1460". In Setton, Kenneth M.; Hazard, Harry W. (eds.). A History of the Crusades, Volume III: The Fourteenth and Fifteenth Centuries. Vol. 3. Madison and London: University of Wisconsin Press. pp. 141–166. ISBN 0-299-06670-3.
- Zacour, Norman P. (1960). "Talleyrand: The Cardinal of Périgord (1301-1364)". Transactions of the American Philosophical Society. New Series. 50 (7). American Philosophical Society: 1–83. doi:10.2307/1005798. JSTOR 1005798.

Titles in pretence
Preceded by Elisabeth of Slavonia	— TITULAR — Latin Empress consort of Constantinople; 1382–1383; Reason for succession failure: Conquest by Empire of Nicaea in 1261	Succeeded by None
