= Antonio della Scala =

Lord of Verona from 1375 to 1387

Antonio I della Scala
- Born: 1362
- Died: 3 September 1388 (aged 25–26)
- Noble family: Scaliger
- Spouse: Samaritana de Polena
- Issue: Canfrancesco della Scala
- Father: Cansignorio della Scala
- Mother: Agnes of Durazzo

Antonio della Scala (1362 – 3 September 1388) was Lord of Verona from 1375 until 1387, initially together with his brother Bartolomeo.

Antonio was the illegitimate son of Cansignorio della Scala. At the latter's death, he was associated in the lordship with his brother Bartolomeo. In 1378 he married Samaritana da Polenta, daughter of Guido III da Polenta, lord of Ravenna. In 1381 he is believed to have caused Bartolomeo's death by poison, and reigned alone after 1381, until 1387, when he was deposed by Gian Galeazzo Visconti, Duke of Milan.

While on an expedition to Tuscany to gather soldiers to re-establish his rule in Verona, Antonio died suddenly in 1388, at the age of 26, in Tredozio near Faenza, under unclear circumstances. He was probably buried in Ravenna.

Antonio's brief but eventful reign is remembered for his efforts to improve Verona's fortunes and to maintain the legacy of his illustrious family, the della Scalas. His son was Canfrancesco della Scala claimant of the lordship of Verona.

Preceded by Cansigornio	Lord of Verona and Vicenza; With Bartolomeo II until 1381	To the Duchy of Milan
