= James of Baux =

Titular Latin Emperor from 1374 to 1383

- Prince of Taranto and Achaea; Despot of Romania

Prince of Achaia
- Reign: 1373 – 1383 (disputed until 1381)
- Predecessor: Philip III
- Successor: Louis I of Anjou
- Born: c. 1350
- Died: 7 July 1383
- Spouse: Agnes of Durazzo
- House: House of Baux
- Father: Francis of Baux
- Mother: Margaret

James of Baux or James of Les Baux (died 7 July 1383) was the titular Latin Emperor of Constantinople from 1374 to 1383. He was the last Latin emperor to govern any imperial territory.

James belonged to the noble House of Baux, specifically the branch settled in the Kingdom of Naples. He was the son of Francis, Duke of Andria, and Margaret, daughter of Prince Philip I of Taranto and his second wife, the Empress Catherine II, Princess of Achaea. His mother's brother was Prince Philip II of Taranto. In 1373, the childless Philip declared his nephew his universal heir. He thus stood to inherit the Principality of Taranto in the Neapolitan kingdom, and the Principality of Achaea in Greece, as well as a claim on the Latin Empire.

On the death of Philip II of Taranto in 1374, most of the barons in the principality of Achaea recognized as his heir Queen Joanna I of Naples. She in turn confiscated all the Italian possessions of Francis and James of Baux and banished them from the kingdom. James took refuge in Corfu, while his father fled to Papal Avignon.

In 1376 or 1377, Joanna leased the principality of Achaea to the Knights Hospitaller for five years at four thousands ducats a year. Philip II's relatives put forward a rival candidate in James of Baux. James met with some success in 1380 but did not have complete control until Joanna's death in 1382, when he became the only legitimate claimant to Achaea. In his attempt to reclaim his inheritance, James hired the services of the Navarrese Company, which had originally been hired by the Hospitallers, with whom James was at war. James was now taking the titles "Despot of Romania" and "Prince of Taranto and Achaea". The Navarrese conquered much of Messenia and the towns of Androusa and Kalamata for James, but he did not enjoy this principality long.

Early in 1382, James married Agnes, the widow of Cansignorio della Scala, lord of Verona. She was a daughter of Duke Charles of Durazzo and older sister of Margaret, the wife of Charles III of Naples. She was also (from her mother's side) a niece of Queen Joanna I of Naples. Her marriage to James was intended to solidify his alliance with Charles III. It was childless. James died on 7 July 1383.

== Notes ==
James of Baux House of Baux Died: 1383
Preceded by Philip II of Taranto	— TITULAR — Latin Emperor of Constantinople; 1374–1383; Reason for succession failure: Conquest by Empire of Nicaea in 1261	None¹
Preceded by Philip II of Taranto	Prince of Taranto; 1374–1383	Succeeded by Otto of Brunswick
Preceded by Joan I of Naples	Prince of Achaea; 1380–1383	Succeeded by Charles III of Naples
Notes and references
1. Willed to Louis I of Anjou, who never used the title.
