= Robert of Taranto =

Prince of Taranto from 1333 to 1364

Robert
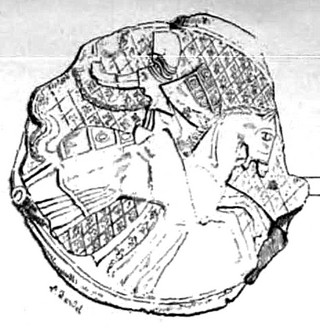
- Seal of Robert of Taranto

Prince of Achaea
- Reign: 1333 – 1364
- Predecessor: John I
- Successor: Maria I of Bourbon
- Regent: Catherine of Valois (1333 – 1346)
- Born: 1319/1326
- Died: 10 September 1364
- Spouse: Marie de Bourbon, Princess of Achaea
- House: House of Anjou-Sicily
- Father: Philip I of Taranto
- Mother: Catherine of Valois-Courtenay

Coat of arms of Robert of Taranto. They are the combination of the arms of Anjou and those of the Latin Empire of Constantinople.

Robert (1319 or early winter 1326 – 10 September 1364), of the Capetian House of Anjou, was prince of Taranto (1331–1346), lord of the Kingdom of Albania (1331–1332), prince of Achaea (1332–1346), and claimant to the Latin Empire (1343 or 1346 – 1364) as Robert II.

He was the oldest surviving son of Prince Philip I of Taranto (1278–1331) and Catherine of Valois-Courtenay.

In 1332, an exchange occurred in which his uncle John, Duke of Durazzo arranged to surrender Achaea to him in exchange for Robert's rights to the Kingdom of Albania and a loan of 5,000 ounces of gold raised upon Niccolò Acciaioli. Robert then officially became Prince of Achaea. Because of his youth, authority was effectively exercised by his mother, Catherine of Valois, until her death in 1346. At that point, Robert inherited the throne of the Latin Empire and was recognised as emperor by the Latin states of Greece. His actual power, such as it was, remained based upon his authority as prince of Achaea. In Naples, on 9 September 1347, Robert married Marie of Bourbon, the daughter of Duke Louis I of Bourbon, constable of Cyprus, but the marriage was childless. He died on 10 September 1364 in Naples and was buried there. After he died, his widow attempted to keep the principality for herself and her son from her previous marriage. However, Robert's younger brother Philip II succeeded.

== Bibliography ==
- Bon, Antoine (1969). La Morée franque. Recherches historiques, topographiques et archéologiques sur la principauté d'Achaïe [The Frankish Morea. Historical, Topographic and Archaeological Studies on the Principality of Achaea] (in French). Paris: De Boccard.
- Lock, Peter (1988). The Franks in the Aegean: 1204-1500. Routledge.
- Topping, Peter (1975). "The Morea, 1311–1364". In Setton, Kenneth M.; Hazard, Harry W. (eds.). A History of the Crusades, Volume III: The Fourteenth and Fifteenth Centuries. Vol. 3. Madison and London: University of Wisconsin Press. pp. 104–140. ISBN 0-299-06670-3.
- Setton, Kenneth Mayer (1975). "Important dates and events". In Setton, Kenneth M.; Hazard, Harry W. (eds.). A History of the Crusades, Volume III: The Fourteenth and Fifteenth Centuries. Vol. 3. Madison and London: University of Wisconsin Press. pp. 667–676. ISBN 0-299-06670-3.

Robert of Taranto House of Anjou-Taranto Cadet branch of the Capetian House of Anjou Born: 1319/1326 Died: 10 September 1364
| Preceded by Philip I of Taranto | Lord of the Kingdom of Albania; 1331 – 1332 | Succeeded by John of Gravina |
| Preceded by Philip I of Taranto | Prince of Taranto; 1331 – 1346 | Succeeded by Louis I of Naples |
| Preceded by Catherine of Valois | — TITULAR — Latin Emperor of Constantinople; 1346 – 1364 | Succeeded by Philip II of Taranto |
| Preceded by John of Gravina | Prince of Achaea; 1332 – 1364 | Succeeded by Philip II of Taranto |
| Preceded by John of Gravina | Count Palatine of Cephalonia and Zakynthos; 1336 – 1357 | Succeeded by Leonardo I Tocco |
