= Bernardino da Polenta =

Bernardino da Polenta may refer to:

- Bernardino da Polenta (lord of Cervia, died 1313)
- Bernardino I da Polenta, lord of Ravenna and Cervia, 1346–1359
- Bernardino II da Polenta, lord of Ravenna and Cerbie, 1389–1400, son of Guido III da Polenta
