= Louis I of Naples =

King of Naples from 1348 to 1362

Louis I
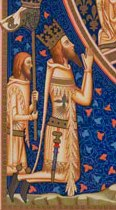
- Louis praying on the occasion of founding his order of chivalry

King of Naples Count of Provence and Forcalquier
- Reign: 18 August 1348 – 26 May 1362
- Coronation: 27 May 1352
- Predecessor: Joanna I
- Successor: Joanna I
- Co-monarch: Joanna I
- Born: 1320; Naples, Kingdom of Naples
- Died: 26 May 1362 (aged 41–42); Naples, Kingdom of Naples
- Burial: Territorial Abbey of Montevergine
- Spouse: Joanna I of Naples
- Issue: Catherine of Taranto; Françoise of Taranto
- House: Capetian House of Anjou
- Father: Philip I of Taranto
- Mother: Catherine of Valois

Louis I (Italian: Luigi, Aloisio, or Ludovico; 1320 – 26 May 1362), also known as Louis of Taranto, was a member of the Capetian House of Anjou who reigned as King of Naples, Count of Provence and Forcalquier, and Prince of Taranto.

Louis gained the crown of Naples by marrying his cousin Queen Joanna I, whose first husband, Andrew, had died as a result of a conspiracy that may have involved both of them. Immediately after securing his status as her co-ruler, Louis successfully wrested away all power from his wife, leaving her a sovereign in name only. Their disastrous marriage resulted in the birth of two daughters, Catherine and Frances, neither of whom survived their parents. During their joint reign, Louis dealt with numerous uprisings, attacks, and unsuccessful military operations; he is generally considered an inefficient monarch. Following his death, Joanna resumed her power and refused to share it with her subsequent husbands.

== Background and family ==
A member of the Capetian House of Anjou, Louis was born in Naples as the second son of Prince Philip I of Taranto, and Catherine of Valois. He was a patrilineal first cousin once removed of both Queen Joanna I of Naples and her husband, Andrew, in addition to being Joanna's maternal first cousin. Louis' older brother, Prince Robert of Taranto, was having an open affair with Queen Joanna. When the 17-year-old Andrew was assassinated on 18 September 1345 for seeking to co-reign with his wife, Joanna was immediately suspected of ordering the murder with the help of Louis and Robert.

Following her husband's death, the young queen was strongly influenced by Robert, but by October 1346, she had become closer to Louis. The brothers' mother died the same month, leaving her claim to the Latin Empire to Robert, who in turn ceded the Principality of Taranto to Louis.

== Marriage ==
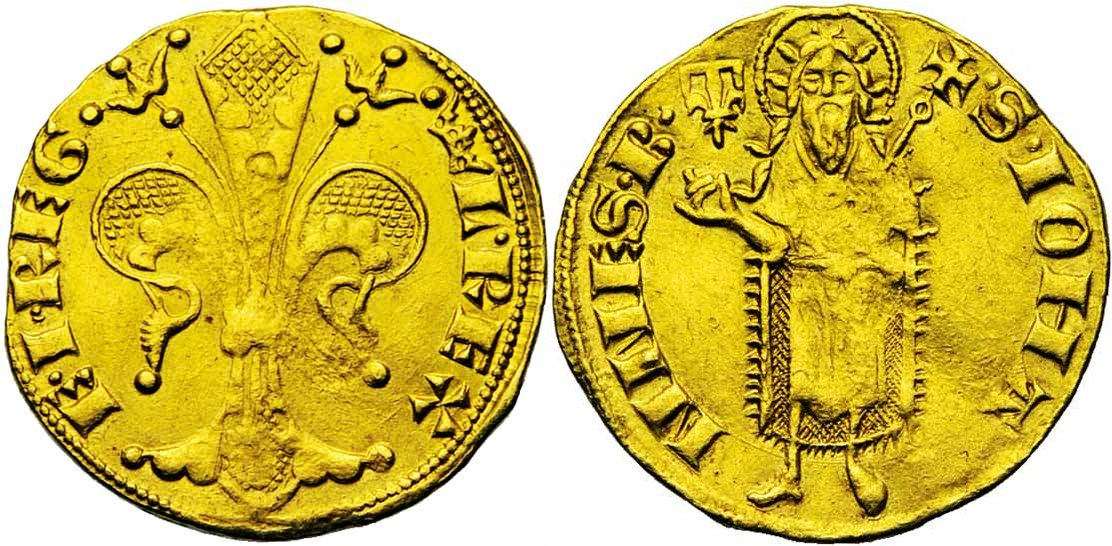
Provençal coin of "King Louis and Queen Joanna" (L· REX- E· I· REG), struck between 1349 and 1362

Louis and Joanna married in Naples on 22 August 1347, without seeking dispensation from Pope Clement VI – necessary because of their being closely related. The marriage was an attempt to secure the kingdom for Louis rather than to pacify the belligerent branches of the House of Anjou.

=== Ascension to power ===
The couple fled to Provence, which Joanna ruled as countess, after King Louis I of Hungary invaded Naples to avenge the murder of his brother Andrew. They met Clement, feudal overlord of the Kingdom of Naples, in Avignon. To secure his acceptance of their marriage and support against the accusations of Andrew's murder, Joanna sold him the city.

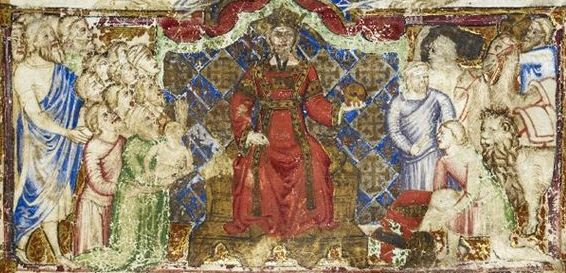
Detail of an Arthurian-themed manuscript made for Louis, showing him enthroned

The Black Death forced the Hungarians to retreat from Naples in August 1348. Louis and Joanna, who had just had their elder daughter, Catherine, immediately returned to the kingdom. On 18 August 1348, Louis, with the queen's consent, assumed the title of King of Jerusalem and Sicily, obviously without the pope's approval. From early 1349 onwards, all documents for the kingdom were issued in the names of both husband and wife, and Louis was indisputably in control of military fortresses. On coins issued during their joint reign, Louis' name always preceded Joanna's. Although he was not officially recognised by Clement as king and co-ruler until 1352, it is likely that Neapolitans considered him their monarch from the moment he started acting as such.

Louis took advantage of the turmoil caused by yet another Hungarian attack to wrest complete royal authority from his wife. He purged the court of her supporters, and struck down her favourite, Enrico Caracciolo, whom he accused of adultery in April 1349 and very likely had executed.

=== Official reign ===
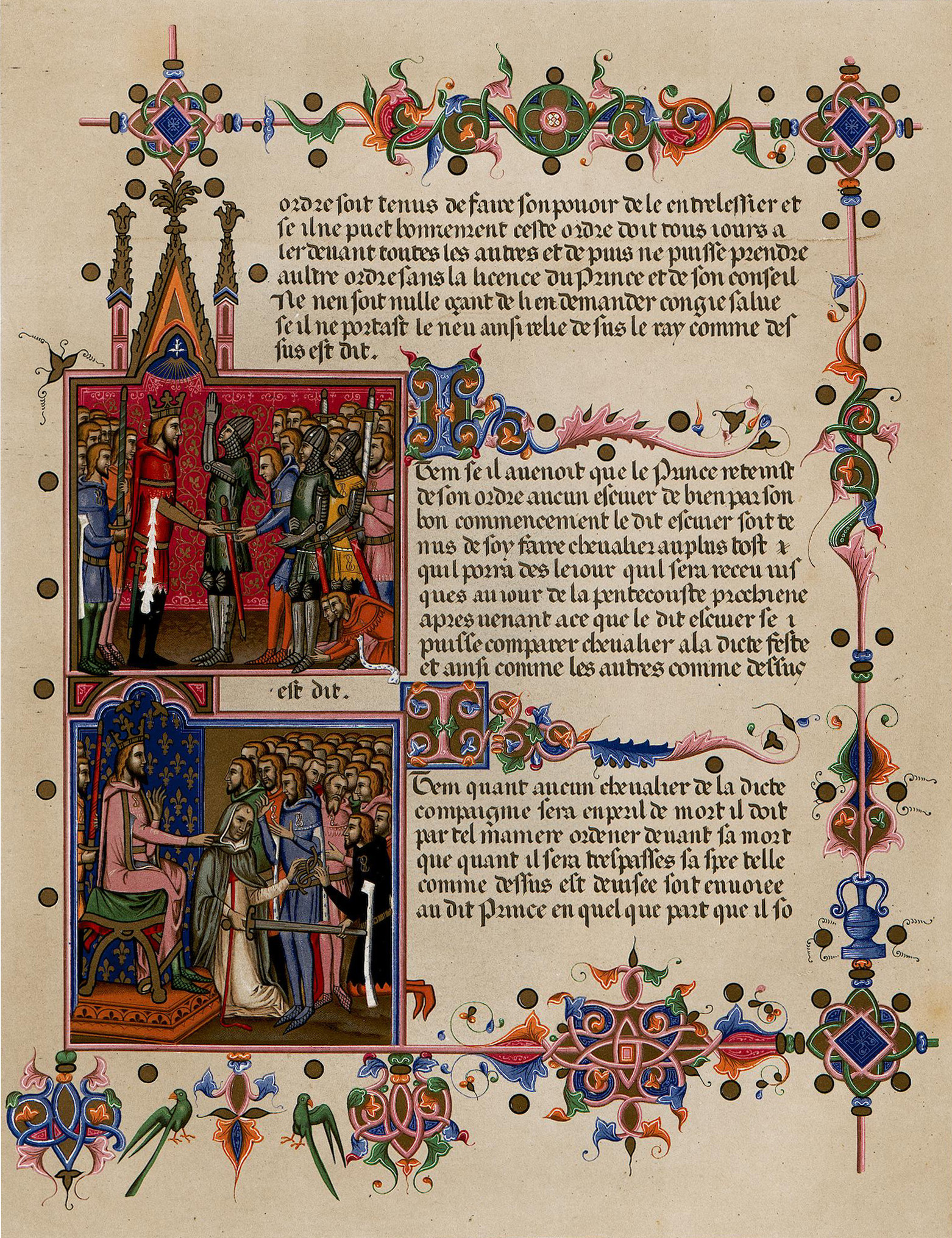
Page of the statutes of the Order of the Knot (19th-century facsimile)

In 1350, King Louis of Hungary launched another invasion, forcing Louis and Joanna to flee to Gaeta. Louis narrowly defeated Hungarian forces with Pope Clement's help. Clement, however, reprimanded Louis for "treating the queen as a prisoner and servant", and agreed to recognise Louis as king and co-ruler only on the condition that he accepted the fact that he held the crown in Joanna's right. Their younger daughter, Françoise, was born soon thereafter. Louis received Clement's formal recognition as his wife's co-ruler in all her realms on 20 or 23 March 1352, and was crowned king alongside her on Pentecost on 25 or 27 May 1352. Françoise, by then the couple's only surviving child, died on their coronation day. Louis founded the Order of the Knot on the occasion of the coronation, most likely hoping to enhance the tarnished reputation he shared with Joanna. In 1356, they were crowned in Messina as rulers of Sicily, but failed to capture the entire island, which had been seized from the House of Anjou by the House of Barcelona in 1285 and thereafter ruled as a separate kingdom.

The death of their supporter, Clement VI, was a blow to Louis and Joanna. His successor, Innocent VI, excommunicated them for failing to pay their annual tribute to the Holy See. The issue was resolved by a visit to Avignon in 1360.

Louis' attempt in 1360 to dethrone Frederick the Simple and regain Sicily for the Angevins ended in a failure, though he did manage to occupy much of the island (including Palermo, the capital) before its barons rebelled. At home, he faced opposition from his and his wife's cousins, the Durazzo Angevins, who strongly resented his dominance, with Count Louis of Gravina stirring revolts in Apulia.

== Death and legacy ==
Louis died, probably of bubonic plague, in Naples on 26 May 1362. Joanna immediately resumed authority in her realms. Although she remarried twice more, to James IV of Majorca and Otto of Brunswick-Grubenhagen, Louis remained the only husband of hers whom she accorded the status of co-monarch. Taranto passed to his younger brother, Philip II. Upon Louis' death, the order he had created simply dissolved. He was buried in the Territorial Abbey of Montevergine, next to his mother.

Though a chronicler wrote that the "death of Louis of Taranto caused great corruption in all the kingdom", his contemporaries unanimously thought him to be lacking in both ability and character. Petrarch, familiar with the members of the Neapolitan court, described him as "violent and mendacious, prodigal and avaricious, debauched and cruel", a person who "knew neither how to make his subjects love him" and who even had no "need of their love". Louis I's greatest achievement was appointing Niccolò Acciaioli as grand seneschal, which provided Naples with a capable administrator and military leader.

== Family tree ==
Charles II of Naples | Mary of Hungary
Charles Martel | Robert of Naples | Charles of Valois | John, Duke of Durazzo | Eleanor of Naples
Charles I of Hungary | Charles of Calabria | Mary of Valois | Catherine of Valois | Philip I of Taranto | Louis of Gravina | Peter II of Sicily
Louis I of Hungary | Andrew of Calabria | Joanna I of Naples | Louis I of Naples | Philip II of Taranto | Robert of Taranto | Charles III of Naples | Frederick III of Sicily

== See also ==
- Jure uxoris, the principle by which a man owns the property of his wife
- James II, Count of La Marche, husband of Joanna II of Naples who tried to usurp her authority

== Bibliography ==
- Giornale araldico-genealogico-diplomatico dell'Accademia araldica italiana. Vol. 4. Pisa: La direzione del giornale araldico. 1877.
- Giuseppe Pupillo; Operatori C.R.S.E.C. BA/7 (2017). Altamura, immagini e descrizioni storiche (PDF). Matera: Antezza Tipografi. ISBN 9788889313282. Archived from the original (PDF) on 21 October 2018.
- Zacour, Norman P. (1960). "Talleyrand: The Cardinal of Périgord (1301-1364)". Transactions of the American Philosophical Society. New Series. 50 (7). American Philosophical Society: 1–83. doi:10.2307/1005798. JSTOR 1005798.

Louis I of Naples House of Anjou Cadet branch of the House of Capet Born: 1320 Died: 26 May 1362
Regnal titles
| Preceded by Joanna I as sole ruler | King of Naples; Count of Provence and Forcalquier; 1348–1362 with Joanna I | Succeeded by Joanna I as sole ruler |
| Preceded by Robert | Prince of Taranto; 1346–1362 | Succeeded by Philip II |
