= Cangrande II della Scala =

Lord of Verona from 1351 to 1359

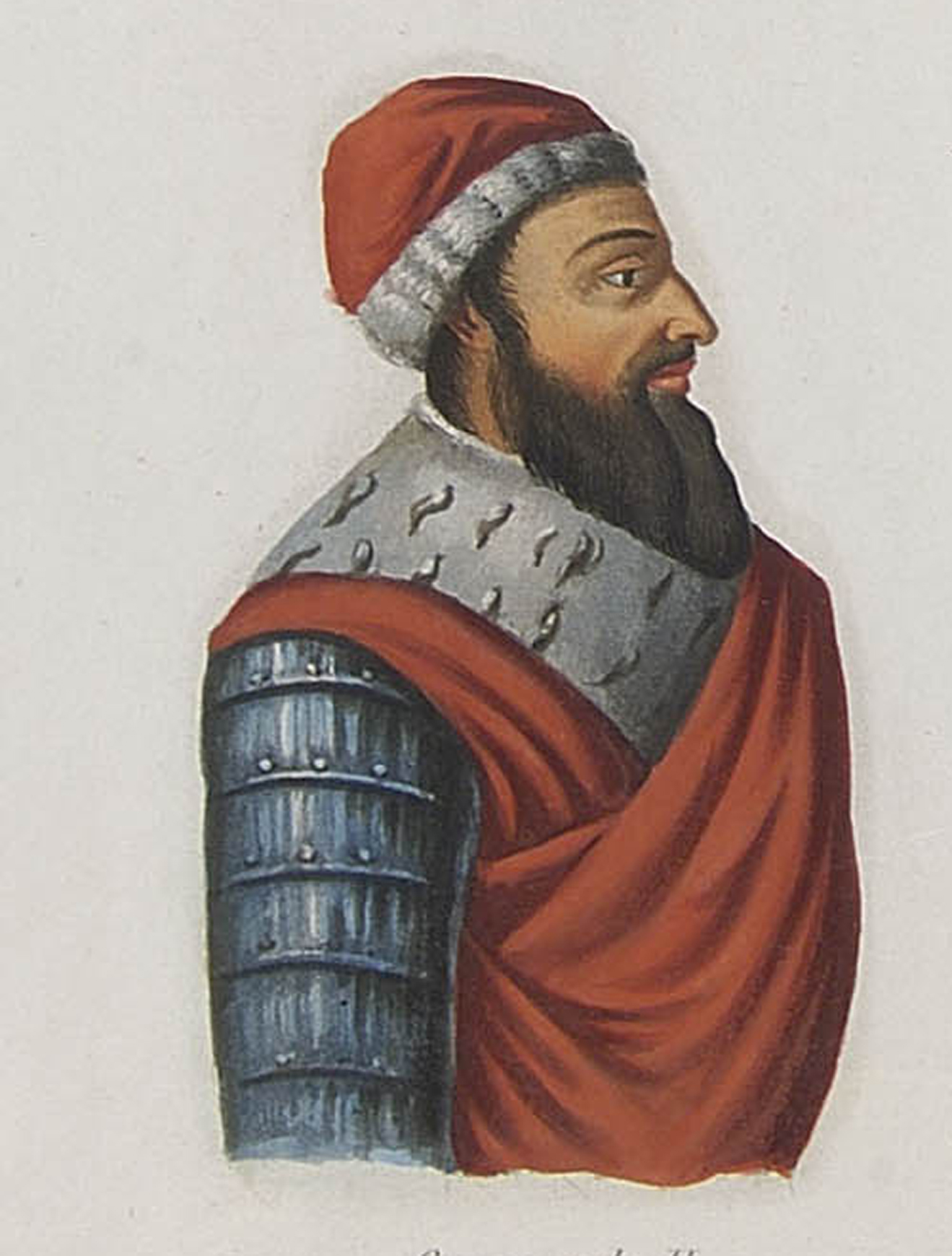
- Born: 8 June 1332; Verona
- Died: 14 December 1359 (aged 27); Verona
- Noble family: Scaliger
- Spouse: Elizabeth of Bavaria
- Issue: Guglielmo della Scala
- Father: Mastino II della Scala
- Mother: Taddea de Carrara

Cangrande II della Scala (7 June 1332 – 14 December 1359) was Lord of Verona from 1351 until his death.

In 1351, after the death of his father Mastino II della Scala, he inherited the lordship of Verona and Vicenza, initially (until 1352) under the regency of his uncle Alberto II. In 1350 he married Elizabeth, daughter of Emperor Louis IV of Bavaria and Margaret II, Countess of Hainault.

Cangrande, nicknamed Can Rabbioso ("Raging Dog") ruled Verona with iron fist, amassing rich treasures for his illegitimate sons and impoverishing the city. This caused internal strifes which led the suspicious Cangrande to surround himself with Brandenburg mercenaries. This did not prevent him being assassinated by his brother Cansignorio, who, with the help of the Carraresi of Padua, succeeded him.

Cangrande had a castle and a fortified bridge built in the town (see Castelvecchio and Castelvecchio Bridge) in order to grant him a safe place and a safe escape route towards Germany in the event of revolt against him in the city.

Among his children were:

- Antonia della Scala (died 1400), married to Mastino Visconti, son of Bernabò Visconti and Beatrice Regina della Scala.
- Cleofa della Scala (died 1403), married to Giammastino Visconti, younger brother of Mastino.

He also had a natural son:

- (illegitimate) Guglielmo della Scala.

Preceded by Mastino II	Lord of Verona and Vicenza; 1351–1359	Succeeded by Cansignorio; Paolo Albonio
