= Bartolomeo II della Scala =

Lord of Verona from 1375 to 1381

- Born: c.1360
- Died: 12 July 1381
- Noble family: Scaliger
- Father: Cansignorio della Scala
- Mother: Agnes of Durazzo

Bartolomeo II della Scala (died 12 July 1381) was lord of Verona from 1375 until his death, together with his brother Antonio I della Scala.

The illegitimate son of Cansignorio della Scala, he obtained the power in Verona after the latter's death by assassinating Cansignorio's brother, Paolo Alboino. He ruled Verona, who was then in bankruptcy and forced to accept the protectorate of Bernabò Visconti.

After a period of moderate reign, Bartolomeo was assassinated by his brother Antonio.

Preceded by Cansignorio	Lord of Verona and Vicenza; Together with Antonio	Succeeded by Antonio
