= Paolo Alboino della Scala =

- Born: 1344
- Died: 17 October 1375 (aged 30–31)
- Noble family: Scaliger
- Father: Mastino II della Scala
- Mother: Taddea da Carrara

Paolo Alboino della Scala (1344 – 17 or 18 October 1375) was a lord of Verona of the Scaliger dynasty.

In 1351, after the death of his father Mastino II della Scala, he inherited the lordship of Verona and Vicenza, nominally together with his brothers Cangrande and Cansignorio although soon Cangrande stripped them of all effective power.

When Cangrande was assassinated by Cansignorio on 14 December 1359, Paolo Alboino and Cansignorio ruled jointly. However, on 20 February 1365, Paolo was arrested with the accusation of having conjured and imprisoned in Peschiera del Garda. In 1375 he was strangled by order of his nephew Bartolomeo II, who wanted sole power after the death of Cansignorio.

Preceded by Cangrande II	Lord of Verona and Vicenza; Together with Cansignorio; 1359–1365	Succeeded by Cansignorio
