= Cansignorio della Scala =

Lord of Verona from 1359 to 1375

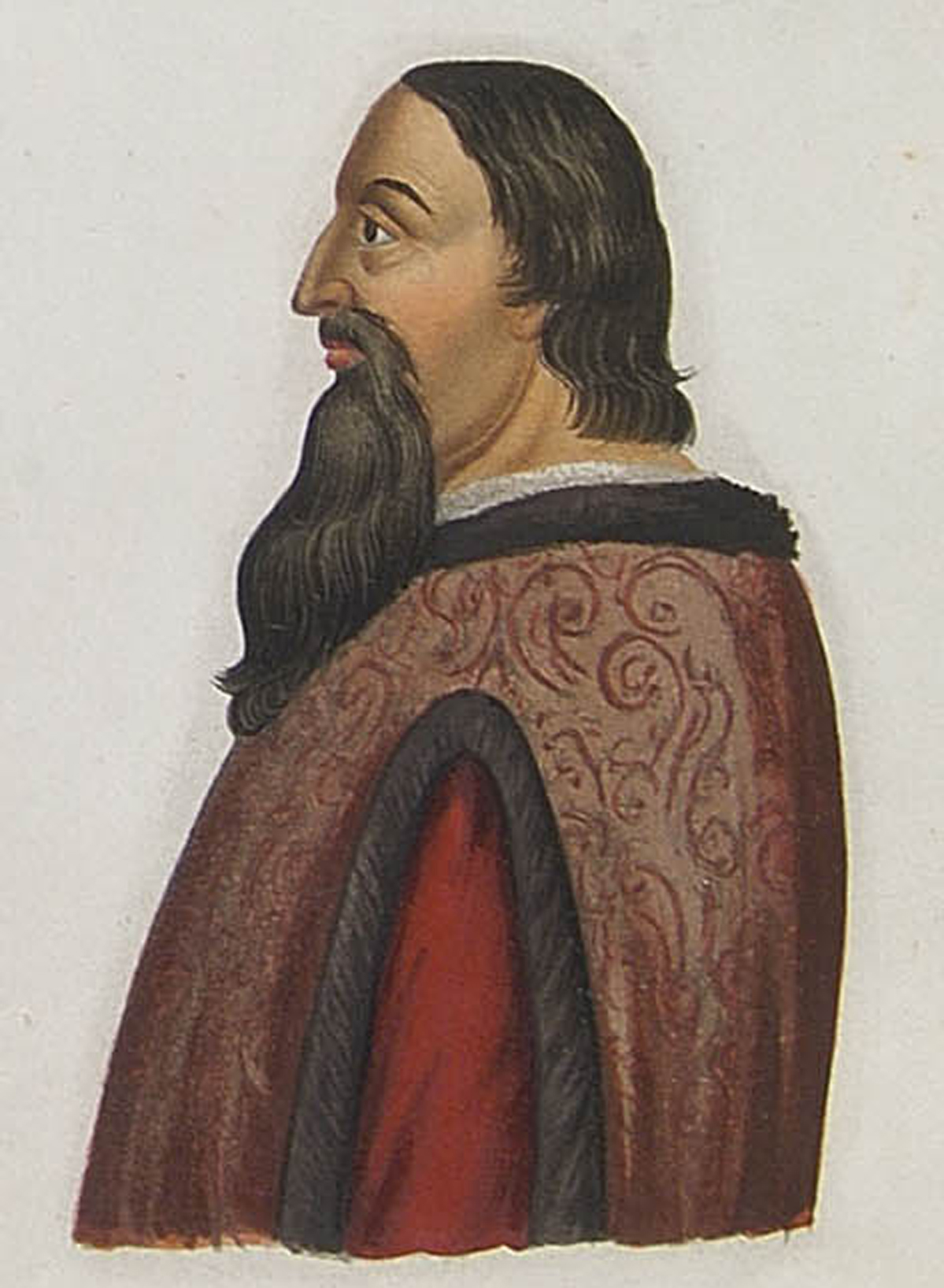

Lord of Verona and Vicenza
- In office 1359–1375
- Preceded by: Cangrande II della Scala
- Succeeded by: Bartolomeo II della Scala

Personal details
- Born: 5 March 1340 Verona
- Died: 19 October 1375 (aged 35) Verona
- Spouse: Agnes of Durazzo
- Children: Antonio I della Scala; Bartolomeo II della Scala
- Parents: Mastino II della Scala (father); Taddea da Carrara (mother)

Cansignorio della Scala (5 March 1340 – 19 October 1375) was Lord of Verona from 1359 until 1375, initially together with his brother Paolo Alboino.

== Biography ==
He inherited the lordship of Verona at the death of his father Mastino, together with his brothers Cangrande II and Paolo Alboino. However, Cangrande took the effective reins. Cansignorio plotted against his tyrannic rule and, after having him assassinated, could enter the city in 1359 with the help of the Carraresi of Padua.

== Legacy ==
Before his death in 1375 he had his brother Paolo Alboino (who had been in prison since 1365) assassinated to give the succession to his illegitimate sons Bartolomeo II and Antonio. The latter however were forced by the city's bankruptcy to accept the protectorate of Bernabò Visconti.

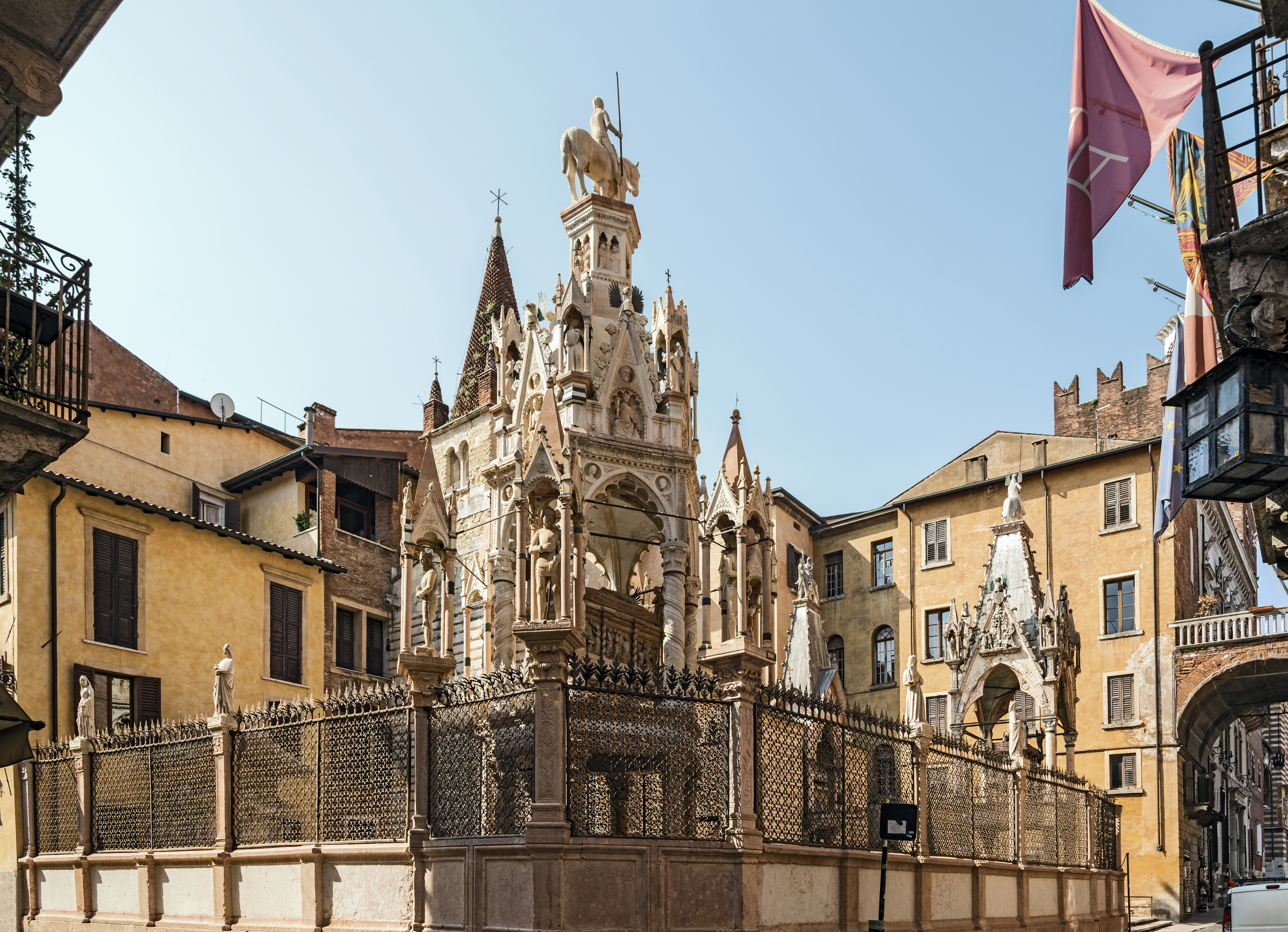
Funeral monument of Cansignorio della Scala

Despite his ruthless character, Cansignorio ruled Verona quite moderately and enriched it with numerous constructions, including the first masonry bridge over the Adige since the Ponte Pietra (Verona) and the first watchtower in Italy, the Gardello. Cansignorio's tomb is one of the notable Gothic Scaliger tombs in the courtyard of Santa Maria Antica of Verona.

== Marriage and children ==
Cansignorio married Agnes of Durazzo, second daughter of Charles, Duke of Durazzo and Maria of Calabria. Agnes was a younger sister of Joanna, Duchess of Durazzo and an older sister of Margherita of Durazzo, Queen consort of Charles III of Naples.

Their marriage was childless. Cansignorio had three known children, all illegitimate. His daughter Lucia della Scala married first Cortesia Serego and then Bernardino da Polenta of the ruling family of Ravenna. His sons Bartolomeo II della Scala and Antonio I della Scala would succeed as Lords of Verona.

Preceded by Cangrande II	Lord of Verona and Vicenza; 1359–1375	Succeeded by Bartolomeo II; Antonio
