= Capetian House of Anjou =

House of the Capetian dynasty in France from 1246 to 1435

House of Anjou
- Arms of the Capetian House of Anjou
- Parent house: Capetian dynasty
- Country: Kingdom of France, Kingdom of Sicily, Kingdom of Naples, Kingdom of Hungary, Kingdom of Poland, Kingdom of Croatia, Kingdom of Albania, Principality of Albania, Principality of Achaea
- Founded: 1246; 780 years ago
- Founder: Charles I of Naples
- Final ruler: Joanna II of Naples
- Titles: Latin Emperor (titular); King of Sicily; King of Jerusalem; King of Naples; King of Hungary; King of Croatia; King of Dalmatia; King of Poland; King of Galicia and Lodomeria; King of Albania; King of Bulgaria; King of Arles; King of Thessalonica (titular); Prince of Achaea; Prince of Salerno; Prince of Taranto; Duke of Calabria; Duke of Apulia; Duke of Durazzo; Duke of Transylvania; Duke of Slavonia; Count of Anjou; Count of Maine; Count of Touraine; Count of Provence; Count of Forcalquier; Count of Gravina
- Dissolution: 1435; 591 years ago
- Cadet branches: House of Anjou-Durazzo; House of Anjou-Hungary; House of Anjou-Taranto

The Capetian House of Anjou, or House of Anjou-Sicily, was a royal house and cadet branch of the Capetian dynasty. It is one of three separate royal houses referred to as Angevin, meaning "from Anjou" in France. Founded by Charles I of Anjou, the youngest son of Louis VIII of France, the Capetian king first ruled the Kingdom of Sicily during the 13th century. The War of the Sicilian Vespers later forced him out of the island of Sicily, leaving him with the southern half of the Italian Peninsula, known as the Kingdom of Naples. The house and its various branches would go on to influence much of the history of Southern and Central Europe during the Middle Ages until it became extinct in 1435.

Historically, the house ruled the Counties of Anjou, Maine, Touraine, Provence and Forcalquier; the Principalities of Achaea and Taranto; and the Kingdoms of Sicily, Naples, Hungary, Croatia, Albania and Poland.

== Rise of Charles I and his sons ==
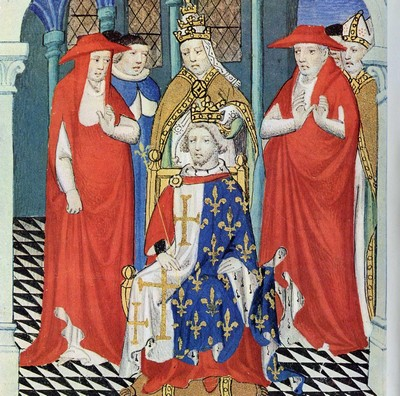
The seated Charles I of Sicily is crowned by Pope Clement IV.

A younger son of the House of Capet king Louis VIII of France the Lion, Charles was first given a noble title by his brother, Louis IX of France who succeeded to the French throne in 1226. Charles was named Count of Anjou and Maine; the feudal County of Anjou was a western vassal state of the Kingdom of France, which the Capetians had wrested from the House of Plantagenet only a few decades earlier. Charles married an heiress of the County of Provence named Beatrice of Provence. She was a member of the House of Barcelona; this meant Charles' holdings were growing as Count of Provence. After fighting in the Seventh Crusade, Charles was offered the Kingdom of Sicily by Pope Clement IV. At the time this included not only the island of Sicily but also the southern half of the Italian Peninsula. Pope Clement IV offered it to Charles because of a conflict between the papacy and the Holy Roman Empire, and the latter was represented by the ruling House of Hohenstaufen.

It was at the Battle of Benevento that the Guelph Capetians gained the Sicilian kingdom from the Ghibelline Swabians, this was cemented after victory at Tagliacozzo. In keeping with the political landscape of the period, Charles is described by scholars as shrewd, energetic and highly ambitious. He signed the Treaty of Viterbo in 1267 with Baldwin II of Courtenay and William II of Villehardouin, the political alliance gave many of the rights of the Latin Empire to Charles and a marriage alliance for his daughter Beatrice of Sicily. The Byzantines had taken back the city of Constantinople in 1261 and this was a plan to take it back from Michael VIII Palaiologos. It also recognised Charles' possession of Corfu and cities in the Balkans such as Durazzo, as well as giving him suzerainty over the Principality of Achaea and sovereignty of the Aegean islands aside from those already held by the Republic of Venice. For a while Charles was preoccupied helping his French brother in the unsuccessful Eighth Crusade on Tunis. After this he once again focused on Constantinople, but his fleet was wrecked in a freak storm off the coast of Trapani. With the elevation of Pope Gregory X, there was a truce between Charles and Michael in the form of the Council of Lyons, as Christians focused on improving ecumenical relations, with hopes of regaining the Kingdom of Jerusalem back from the Muslims.

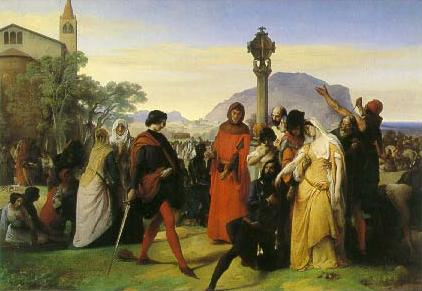
Artistic depiction of the Sicilian Vespers

Charles had fully solidified his rule over Durazzo by 1272, creating a small Kingdom of Albania for himself, out of previously Despotate of Epirus territory; he was well received by local chiefs.

Charles's empire in 1280

Charles's regime was driven out of Sicily after Sicilian Vespers in 1282, but his house ruled Naples until 1435, when René of Anjou inherited the kingdom.

== Charles II and division of the inheritance ==
This House of Anjou included the branches of Anjou-Hungary, which ruled Hungary (1308–1385, 1386–1395) and Poland (1370–1399), Anjou-Taranto, which ruled the remnants of the Latin Empire (1313–1374) and Anjou-Durazzo, which ruled Naples (1382–1435) and Hungary (1385–1386).

The senior line of the House of Anjou-Durazzo became extinct in the male line with the death of King Ladislaus of Naples in 1414, and totally extinct with the death of his sister Joanna II in 1435.

== Cadet branches ==
=== Hungary ===
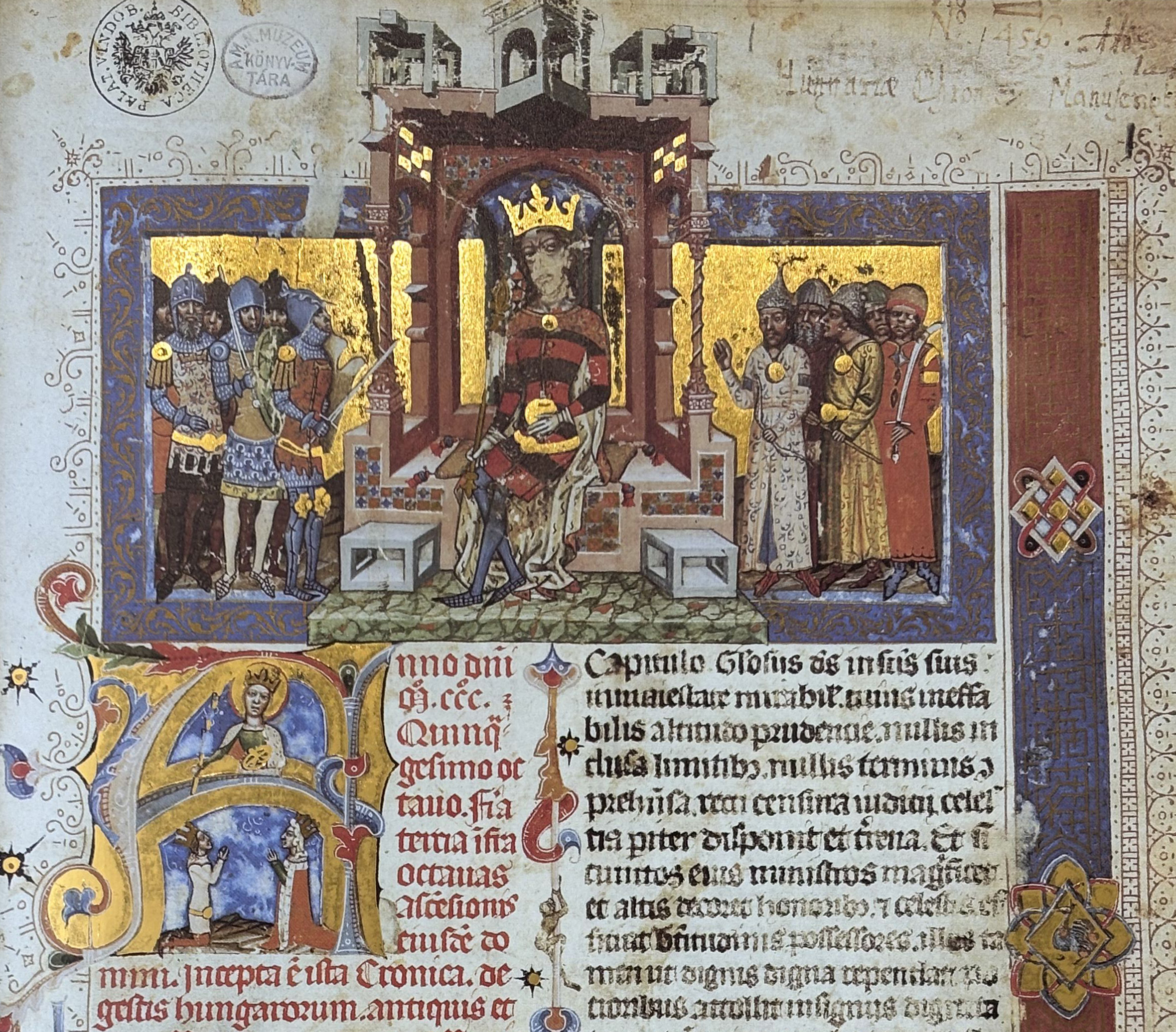
King Louis I of Hungary on the throne around his knights (Chronicon Pictum, 1358)

During the Middle Ages, there were several marriages between the Árpád dynasty and the House of Capet. Charles I, founder of the House of Anjou-Sicily, with his first wife, Beatrice of Provence fathered his eldest son, Charles II of Naples. (Their youngest daughter, Elizabeth was given in marriage to the future Ladislaus IV of Hungary in 1269, but Ladislaus preferred his mistresses to her, and the marriage remained childless). In 1270, Charles II married Mary of Hungary, daughter of Stephen V of Hungary and Elizabeth the Cuman. They had fourteen children which provided the House of Anjou-Sicily with a secure position in Naples.

The childless Ladislaus IV of Hungary (1262–1290), was succeeded by Andrew III as King of Hungary. He was the son of Stephen the Posthumous, considered by Stephen's much older half-brothers (Béla IV of Hungary, Coloman of Halych, Andrew II of Halych) a bastard son of infidelity. For this reason, after the death of Ladislaus IV some of the Árpád dynasty's cognates sought the family as extinct. In Naples, Charles Martel of Anjou, the eldest son of Mary of Hungary announced his claim to the Hungarian crown, backed by his mother, and the Pope. He started to style himself King of Hungary, but he never managed to gain enough support from the Hungarian magnates to realize his claim.

With Andrew III's death (1301), the "last golden branch" of the tree of King Saint Stephen's family ended. The Hungarian diet was determined to keep the blood of Saint Stephen (first king of Hungary) on the throne in the maternal line at least. In the upcoming years, a civil war followed between various claimants to the throne. After the short period of rule of Wenceslaus of Bohemia (1301–1305), and Otto of Bavaria (1305–1307) the civil war ended with Charles Robert's (1308–1342) victory, the son of Charles Martel of Anjou, but he was forced to continue fighting against the powerful Hungarian lords up to the early 1320s.

I. Charles I of Anjou 1226/7–1285 king of Sicily(-Naples) = Beatrice of Provence

II. Blanche (died 1269) = Robert lord of Béthune
II. Beatrice 1252–1275 = Philip titular Latin Emperor of Constantinople
II. Elisabeth 1261–1303 = Ladislaus IV of Hungary
II. Charles II of Naples the Lame 1254–1309 = Mary of Hungary

III. Charles Martel (1271–1295), titular King of Hungary = Clemence of Austria

IV. Charles I (1288–1342), King of Hungary = 1. Maria of Galicia (?), 2. Mary of Bytom, 3. Beatrice of Luxembourg, 4. Elisabeth of Poland

V. (1.) Catherine (died 1355) = Henry II, Duke of Świdnica
V. (4.) Charles (1321–1321/3)
V. (4.) Ladislaus (1324–1329)
V. (4.) Louis I of Hungary (1326–1382) = 1. Margaret of Bohemia, 2. Elizabeth of Bosnia

VI. (2.) Catherine (1370–1378)
VI. (2.) Mary of Hungary 1371–1395 = Sigismund of Luxembourg
VI. (2.) Jadwiga of Poland 1373/4–1399 = Władysław II Jagiełło

V. (4.) Andrew, Duke of Calabria (1327–1345) = Joanna I of Naples

VI. Charles Martel, Duke of Calabria (1345–1348)

V. (4.) Elizabeth (?) (b. 1327/1332) = Boleslaus II of Troppau
V. (4.) Stephen (1332–1354) duke of Slavonia = Margaret of Bavaria

VI. Elizabeth 1352–1380 = Philip II, Prince of Taranto, titular Emperor of Constantinople
VI. John (1354–1360), duke of Croatia, Dalmatia and Slavonia

V. Coloman (1317–1375), Bishop of Győr – illegitimate son with daughter of Gurke Csák

IV. Beatrice (1290–1354) = Jean II de La Tour du Pin, Dauphin du Viennois
IV. Clementia of Hungary (1293–1328) = Louis X of France

III. Margaret (1273–1299) = Charles of Valois
III. Saint Louis of Toulouse (1274–1298), Bishop of Toulouse
III. Robert the Wise (1275–1343), King of Naples = 1. Yolanda of Aragon, 2. Sancia of Majorca

IV. (1.) Charles (1298–1328), Duke of Calabria, Viceroy of Naples = 1. Catherine of Habsburg (1295–1323), 2. Marie of Valois (1309–1332)

V. (2.) Eloisa (1325–1325)
V. (2.) Joanna I of Naples (1326–1382) = Andrew, Duke of Calabria (1327–1345)
V. (2.) Charles Martel (1327–1327)
V. (2.) Maria of Calabria (1329–1366) = 1. Charles, Duke of Durazzo 2. Robert of Baux, Count of Avellino 3. Philip II, Prince of Taranto

IV. (1.) Louis (1301–1310)
IV. (i.) Charles d'Artois c. 1300–1346, grand chamberlain for Queen Joanna I – illegitimate with Cantelma Cantelmo
IV. (i.) Maria d'Aquino (Boccaccio's Fiammetta) – illegitimate
IV. (i.) Hélène of Anjou (13??–1342), Countess of Mat – illegitimate = Andrea I Thopia, Count of Mat

V. Karl Thopia (1331–1388), Prince of Albania = Voisava Balsha

VI. Gjergj Thopia (fl. 1388 – d. 1392), Prince of Albania and Lord of Durrës = Teodora Branković
VI. Helena Thopia (fl. 1388 – 1403), Princess of Albania and Lady of Krujë = 1. Marco Barbarigo, 2. Kostandin Balsha
VI. Voisava Thopia, Princess of Albania and Lady of Lezhë = 1. Lord Isaac Cursachio, 2. Progon Dukagjini
VI. (i.) Niketa Thopia (fl. 1388 – d. 1415), Lord of Krujë after capturing the city from his half-sister Helena illegitimate = Komnen Arianiti's daughter
VI. (i.) Maria Thopia, Baroness of Botrugno illegitimate = Filippo Maramonte

III. Philip I 1278–1331, Prince of Taranto and Achaea = 1. Thamar Angelina Komnene 2. Catherine of Valois–Courtenay

IV. (1.) Charles of Taranto 1296–1315, vicar of Romania
IV. (1.) Joan of Anjou 1297–1323 = 1.Oshin of Armenia 2. Oshin of Korikos
IV. (1) Margarete 1298–1340 = Walter VI, Count of Brienne titular duke of Athens
IV. (1.) Philip, Despot of Romania 1300–1330 = Violante (daughter of James II of Aragon)
IV. (1.) Maria 1301/4–1368, abbess in Conversano
IV. (1.) Blanche 1309–1337 = Ramon Berenguer infante of Aragon, count of Prades (son of James II of Aragon)
IV. (1.) Beatrice = Walter II of Brienne.
IV. (2.) Margaret c. 1325–1380 = Francis de Baux duke of Adria
IV. (2.) Robert, Prince of Taranto 1326–1365, titular Latin emperor of Constantinople
IV. (2.) Louis, Prince of Taranto 1327/8–1362, king of Naples as husband of Joanna I of Naples
IV. (2.) Philip, Prince of Taranto 1329–1374, prince of Achaea, titular Latin emperor of Constantinople = 1. Maria of Calabria 2. Elisabeth of Slavonia

III. Blanche of Anjou (1280–1310) = James II of Aragon
III. Raymond Berengar (1281–1307), Count of Provence, Prince of Piedmont and Andria = Margaret of Clermont
III. John (1283–1308), a priest
III. Tristan (1284–bef. 1288)
III. Eleanor of Anjou, (1289–1341) = Frederick III of Sicily
III. Maria of Naples (1290–c. 1346) = 1. Sancho I of Majorca, 2. Jaime de Ejerica
III. Peter Tempesta (1291–1315), Count of Gravina
III. John (1276–1335), Duke of Durazzo, Prince of Achaea, and Count of Gravina = 1. Matilda of Hainaut (1293–1336), 2. Agnes of Périgord (d. 1345)

IV. (2.) Charles, Duke of Durazzo (1323–1348) = Maria of Calabria

V. Joanna, Duchess of Durazzo 1344–1387 = 1. Louis, Count of Beaumont 2. Robert IV of Artois, Count of Eu
V. Agnes of Durazzo 1345–138 = Cansignorio della Scala lord of Verona 2. James of Baux
V. Margaret of Durazzo 1347–1412 = Charles III of Naples

IV. (2.) Louis, Count of Gravina (1324–1362) = Margaret of Sanseverino

V. Louis (1344–d. young)
V. Charles III (1345–1386), king of Naples (1382–1386) and Hungary (1385–1386) = Margaret of Durazzo

VI. Joanna II of Naples 1371–1435 = 1. William, Duke of Austria 2. James II, Count of La Marche
VI. Ladislaus of Naples 1377–1414 = 1. Costanza Chiaramonte, 2. Mary of Lusignan, 3. Mary of Enghien

V. Agnes (1347–d. young)

IV. (2.) Robert of Durazzo (1326–1356)

III. Beatrice (1295–c. 1321) = 1. Azzo VIII d'Este, marchese of Ferrara, 2. Bertrand III of Baux, Count of Andria (d. 1351)

II. Philip 1256–1277, elected king of Sardinia – died childless
II. Robert 1258–1265 – died childless

The three surviving sons of Charles Robert (Charles I of Hungary) were Louis I of Hungary (1326–1382), Andrew, Duke of Calabria (1327–1345), and Stephen, Duke of Slavonia (1332–1354). Louis I had only two surviving daughters, Mary of Hungary (1371–1395), who married the future Holy Roman Emperor Sigismund of Luxembourg, and Hedwig of Poland (1373/74–1399), who was given in marriage to the Grand Duke of Lithuania Władysław II Jagiełło, the future King of Poland. (See the section of Poland.) After Louis I's death without male heirs, Mary's husband, Sigismund of Luxembourg (1368–1437) managed to be accepted as Mary's co-ruler, by the Hungarian lords. When the queen died (1395) the Hungarian crown passed over to the House of Luxembourg.

In 1333, the six years old second son of Charles Robert, Andrew (1327–1345) was taken to the court of Naples by his father for dynastic purposes, who put him under guardianship of Robert the Wise. Andrew was betrothed in 1334 to his cousin Joanna, granddaughter and heiress apparent of King Robert of Naples; Andrew's father was a fraternal nephew of King Robert. At the age of 15 he married Joanna I of Naples. After the death of Robert (1343), the King of Naples, Andrew became a victim of power clashes in the court of Naples.

Robert's claim to the throne was rather tenuous and did not follow primogeniture. Andrew's grandfather, Charles Martel of Anjou, had died young; therefore, the throne should have passed to Andrew's father. However, due to fears of impending invasion from Sicily, it was felt that a seven-year-old heir was too risky and would not be able to hold off invasions. The throne was offered to the next son of Charles II of Naples, Louis, but he refused on religious grounds, and it thus passed to Robert. To recompense Andrew's father, Charles II decided to assign him the claim to Hungary.

Stephen of Anjou (1332–1354), Duke of Slavonia, the third surviving son of Charles Robert, died before his older brother. For this reason, he (and his son) had no chance to take over the rule neither in Hungary, nor in Poland. In 1350, he married Margaret of Bavaria. His marriage with a German princess made him unpopular in Poland. The Polish noblemen acknowledged Louis as Casimir III's sole heir in July 1351 only after he had promised that he would not allow Stephen to participate in the government of Poland. Margaret gave birth to a daughter Elizabeth (in 1370 she married Philip of Taranto), and a son John, who inherited Croatia, Dalmatia and Slavonia from his father, but he was still a child when he died in 1360.

On the death of Louis I of Hungary, Charles III of Naples, son of Louis of Durazzo (1324–1362), the great-grandson of Charles II of Naples and Mary of Hungary, claimed the Hungarian throne as the senior Angevin male, and ousted Louis' daughter Mary of Hungary in December 1385. It was not difficult for him to reach the power, as he counted with the support of several Croatian lords, and many contacts which he made during his period as Duke of Croatia and Dalmatia. However, Elizabeth of Bosnia, widow of Louis and mother of Mary, arranged to have Charles assassinated on 7 February 1386. He died of wounds at Visegrád on 24 February. His son, Ladislaus of Naples would try to obtain the crown of Hungary in the future, but never reached his goal.

=== Poland ===
In 1355, the last Piast king of Poland, Casimir III, designated his sororal nephew, the Angevin king Louis I of Hungary, as his heir presumptive by the Privilege of Buda. Upon the death of Casimir (5 November 1370), who left no legitimate sons, Louis ascended the Polish throne virtually unopposed. The Polish nobility welcomed his accession, rightly believing that Louis would be an absentee king who would not take much interest in Polish affairs. He sent his mother Elizabeth, sister of Casimir III, to govern Poland as regent. Louis probably considered himself first and foremost king of Hungary; he visited his northern kingdom three times and spent there a couple of months altogether. Negotiations with the Polish nobility frequently took place in Hungary. Hungarians themselves were unpopular in Poland, as was the king's Polish mother who governed the kingdom. In 1376, circa 160 Hungarians in her retinue were massacred in Kraków and the queen returned to Hungary disgraced. Louis replaced her with their relative, Vladislaus II of Opole.

The Hungarian-Polish union fell apart after Louis died in 1382. The dissatisfied Polish nobles demanded that his successor in Hungary, Mary, move to Kraków and reign over Hungary and Poland from there. Mary's mother, Elizabeth of Bosnia (widow of Louis and grandniece of Casimir III's father, Vladislaus I), knew that the lack of supporters would render her influence at least as restricted as that of her mother-in-law and refused to move. She abandoned the idea of attempting to subdue the Polish nobility by force and agreed to send her younger surviving daughter, Hedwig, to be crowned as Louis' successor in Poland.

Hedvig (known as Jadwiga in Poland) was crowned "king" in Poland's capital, Kraków, on 16 October 1384. Her coronation either reflected the Polish nobility's opposition to her intended husband, William, becoming king without further negotiation, or simply emphasized her status as queen regnant. With her mother's consent, Jadwiga's advisors opened negotiations with Jogaila, Grand Duke of Lithuania, who was still a pagan, concerning his potential marriage to Jadwiga. Jogaila signed the Union of Krewo, pledging to convert to Roman Catholicism and to promote his pagan subjects' conversion. Jogaila, who took the baptismal name Władysław, married Jadwiga on 15 February 1386. Jogaila, now in Polish styled Władysław Jagiełło, was crowned King of Poland on 4 March 1386. As Jadwiga's co-ruler, Jagiełło worked closely with his wife. Hedvig (or Jadwiga) was childless for over a decade. She became pregnant in late 1398 or early 1399. A newborn princess named Elizabeth Bonifacia was delivered on 22 June 1399 at Wawel Castle. However, the infant died after only three weeks, on 13 July 1399.[153] Jadwiga, too, was on her deathbed. She died on 17 July 1399, four days after her newborn daughter. Thus, the Polish throne went over to the Jagiellonian dynasty of Lithuanian origin. The union of Poland and Lithuania was a decisive moment in the histories of both countries; it marked a beginning of the four centuries of shared history. By 1569, the Polish–Lithuanian union grew into a new state, the Polish–Lithuanian Commonwealth, and lasted until the Third Partition in 1795.

=== Naples ===
After many unsuccessful attempts to drive the Hohenstaufen out of the Kingdom of Sicily, Charles I of Anjou defeated king Manfred at the Battle of Benevento. James II of Aragon, who married Constance II of Sicily of the Hohenstaufen dynasty, would gain control over the island Sicily during the War of the Sicilian Vespers in the 1280s splitting the kingdom in two with the island of Sicily becoming part of the Crown of Aragon while the kingdom of "Sicily" remained under Angevin control.

When King Robert the Wise died in 1343, in his last will and testament, he formally bequeathed his kingdom to his granddaughter Joanna, making no mention of Andrew and thus denying him the right to reign along with Joanna. With the approval of Pope Clement VI, Joanna was crowned sole monarch of Naples in August 1344. Fearing for his life, Andrew wrote to his mother Elizabeth that he would soon flee the kingdom. She intervened, and made a state visit, before she returned to Hungary allegedly bribing Pope Clement to reverse himself and permit the coronation of Andrew.

Hearing of the Pope's reversal, a group of noble conspirators (the involvement of Queen Joanna is unproved) determined to forestall Andrew's coronation. During a hunting trip at Aversa, Andrew left his room in the middle of the night and was set upon by the conspirators. A treacherous servant barred the door behind him, and, as Joanna cowered in their bed, a terrible struggle ensued, Andrew defending himself furiously and shrieking for aid. He was finally overpowered, strangled with a cord, and flung from a window. Isolde, Andrew's Hungarian nurse took the Prince's corpse to the church of the monks, and remained with it until next morning mourning it. When the Hungarian knights arrived she told them everything in their mother tongue so no one else would learn about the truth, and soon they left Naples reporting everything to the Hungarian King.

The deed would taint the rest of Joanna's reign, although she was twice acquitted of any charge in the trials that followed. Andrew's elder brother Louis I of Hungary several times invaded the Kingdom of Naples and drove out Joanna, only to meet with reverses.

In November 1347, Louis set out for Naples with some 1,000 soldiers (Hungarians and Germans), mostly mercenaries. When he reached the border of Joanna's kingdom, he had 2,000 Hungarian knights, 2,000 mercenary heavy cavalry, 2,000 Cuman horse archers and 6000 mercenary heavy infantry. Joanna in the meantime had married her cousin Louis of Taranto and had signed a peace with Naples' traditional enemy, the Kingdom of Sicily. The army of Naples, 2,700 knights and 5,000 infantrymen, was led by Louis of Taranto. On 11 January 1348, in the Battle of Capua, the king of Hungary defeated the army of Louis of Taranto. Four days later the queen repaired to Provence, while her husband followed soon afterwards. All the kingdom's barons swore loyalty to the new ruler as he marched to Naples from Benevento. While visiting Aversa, where his brother had been murdered, Louis had Charles of Durazzo assassinated in revenge by his condottiero. The Neapolitans, who had quickly grown unhappy with the severe Hungarian rule, called back Joan, who paid for her return expedition by selling her rights on Avignon to the popes. She landed near Naples and easily captured it, but the Hungarian commander Ulrich von Wolfart commanded a strong resistance in Apulia. Joanna and Louis would await a new trial on Andrew's assassination, to be held in Avignon. The verdict was Joanna's acquittal from any charge in January 1352, and a peace was signed with Hungary on 23 March 1352. Ultimately, 37 years later, Louis' kinsman Charles III of Naples conquered Naples with Hungarian aid and put Joanna to death.

As the adopted son of Joanna, Louis I of the House of Valois-Anjou (a different cadet branch of the Capetian dynasty related to the House of Valois) claimed the throne of Naples. His son Louis II would size territory parts of the kingdom of Ladislaus of Naples but remain unable to conquer the kingdom. The conflict between the two lines continued until Joanna II of Naples, the last member of the House of Anjou, would name Louis III of Valois-Anjou as her heir but because he died before her so his brother René would succeed her in 1435. Alfonso V of Aragon would use this as a pretext for his invasion of Naples in 1442 reuniting the kingdoms. Other Capetian pretenders would try to size the throne in the 1460s, Italian Wars and the Neapolitan Revolt of 1647 from the Aragonese, Spanish and eventually Hapsburgs. A third Capetian branch, the House of Bourbon would gain control over both Sicilies during the War of the Polish Succession in the 1730s and remained in power with an interruptions during the Coalition Wars until the Unification of Italy.

=== Albania ===
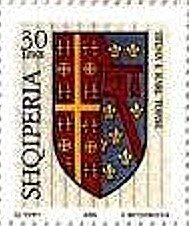
Coat of arms of Karl Thopia as a stamp

The Kingdom of Albania, or Regnum Albaniae, was established by Charles of Anjou in the Albanian territory he acquired from the Despotate of Epirus in the year 1271. He took the title of "King of Albania" in February 1272. The kingdom briefly extended from the region of Dyrrhachium (present-day Durrës in Albania) south along the coast to Butrint. A major attempt to advance further in direction of Constantinople, failed at the Siege of Berat (1280–1281). A Byzantine counteroffensive soon ensued, which drove the Angevins out of the interior by 1282. The Sicilian Vespers further weakened the position of Charles, and the kingdom was soon reduced by the Albanians to a small area centered around Durrës. The Angevins held Durrës until 1368, when Karl Thopia who was the great great grandson of Charles I of Naples captured the city and rules as "Prince of Albania".

== Genealogy of Capetian-Anjou ==
Louis VIII king of France; HOUSE OF CAPET
Louis IX king of France	Charles I king of Sicily(-Naples); CAPETIAN HOUSE OF ANJOU
Charles II king of Naples	Philip king of Sardinia
Charles Martel titular king of Hungary; BRANCH OF HUNGARY	Saint Louis bishop of Toulouse	Robert king of Naples; BRANCH OF NAPLES	Philip I prince of Taranto; BRANCH OF TARANTO	Raymond Berengar count of Andria	Peter Tempesta count of Emboli	John duke of Durazzo; BRANCH OF DURRAZO
Charles I king of Hungary	(illeg.) Charles chamberlain	Charles duke of Calabria (ie heir of Naples)	Charles heir of Taranto	Philip despot of Romania	Robert prince of Taranto	Louis prince of Taranto	Philip II prince of Taranto	Charles duke of Durazzo	Louis count of Gravina	Robert lord of Cappacio
Louis I king of Hungary, Poland	Andrew duke of Calabria	Stephen duke of Slavonia	Joanna I queen of Naples	Joanna duchess of Durazzo	Charles III king of Naples (1382-86), Hungary (1385-1386)
Mary queen of Hungary (1382-1395)	Jadwiga queen of Poland (1384-1399)	John duke of Slavonia	Joanna II queen of Naples (1414-35), tit. of Hungary	Ladislaus king of Naples (1386-1414), tit. of Hungary

== Titles ==
=== Designation and details ===
Title	Held	Designation and details
Count of Anjou	1246–1299	Awarded to Charles I by his brother. Remained under direct control of the Capetian House of Anjou until passing to another Capetian branch the House of Valois by marriage.
Count of Maine	1246–1309	Awarded to Charles I by his brother. Remained under direct control of the Capetian House of Anjou until passing to another Capetian branch the House of Valois-Anjou by creation of John II of France.
Count of Provence	1246–1382	Inherited by marriage between Charles I and Beatrice of Provence who held the county. Issueless Joanna I of Naples left the county to Louis I of Anjou of the House of Valois-Anjou.
King of Sicily	1266–1282	Won the kingdom through conquest.

=== List of monarchs ===
==== Kingdom of Sicily ====
Portrait	Name	From	Until	Relationship with predecessor
	Charles I of Sicily	6 January 1266	4 September 1282	no direct relation to Manfred of Sicily, won the kingdom through right of conquest.

==== Kingdom of Naples ====
Portrait	Name	Branch	From	Until	Relationship with predecessor
	Charles I of Naples	Anjou-Sicily	4 September 1282	7 January 1285	the southern half of the Italian Peninsula was part of the Kingdom of Sicily before the Sicilian Vespers forced Charles out of the island.
	Charles II of Naples (Charles the Lame)	Anjou-Sicily	7 January 1285	5 May 1309	son of Charles I of Naples.
	Robert of Naples (Robert the Wise)	Anjou-Naples	5 May 1309	20 January 1343	son of Charles II of Naples.
	Joanna I of Naples	Anjou-Naples	20 January 1343	12 May 1382	granddaughter of Robert of Naples. Daughter of Charles, Duke of Calabria
	Charles III of Naples (Charles the Short)	Anjou-Durazzo	12 May 1382	24 February 1386	second cousin of Joanna I of Naples, whom he had murdered. Son of Louis of Durazzo.
	Ladislaus of Naples	Anjou-Durazzo	24 February 1386	6 August 1414	son of Charles III of Naples.
	Joanna II of Naples	Anjou-Durazzo	6 August 1414	2 February 1435	sister of Ladislaus of Naples, daughter of Charles III of Naples.

==== Kingdom of Hungary ====
Portrait	Name	Branch	From	Until	Relationship with predecessor
	Charles Robert I of Hungary	Anjou-Hungary	Spring 1301	16 July 1342	Great-grandson of Stephen V, King of Hungary by Mary
	Louis I of Hungary (Louis the Great)	Anjou-Hungary	16 July 1342	10 September 1382	2nd great-grandson of Stephen V, King of Hungary by Mary; 2nd great grandson of Béla IV, King of Hungary by Yolanda
	Mary of Hungary	Anjou-Hungary	10 September 1382	December 1385	daughter of Louis I of Hungary.
	Charles II of Hungary (Charles the Short of Naples)	Anjou-Durazzo	December 1385	24 February 1386	second-cousin once removed of Mary of Hungary; great-grandson of Charles II of Naples. Usurped the throne from her.
	Mary of Hungary (restored)	Anjou-Hungary	24 February 1386	17 May 1395	second-cousin once removed of Charles II of Hungary; great-great-granddaughter of Charles II of Naples.

==== Kingdom of Poland ====
Portrait	Name	Branch	From	Until	Relationship with predecessor
	Louis of Poland (Louis the Great of Hungary)	Anjou-Hungary	17 November 1370	10 September 1382	nephew of Casimir III of Poland, the last Piast agnate.
	Jadwiga of Poland	Anjou-Hungary	16 October 1384	17 July 1399	daughter of Louis of Poland.

== Armorial ==
As a younger (youngest) son of Louis VIII the Lion of France, Charles was assigned the arms based on the coat of arms of France of the Capetian dynasty differenced, like his brothers, with the gold castle of Castile on red/gules based on his mother, Blanche of Castile's arms. Charles was invested in August 1246 by his brother Louis IX of France as Count of Anjou and Maine. Also, in 1246 Charles married an heiress of the County of Provence, Beatrice of Provence. She was a member of the House of Barcelona; this meant Charles became Count of Provence in right of his wife.

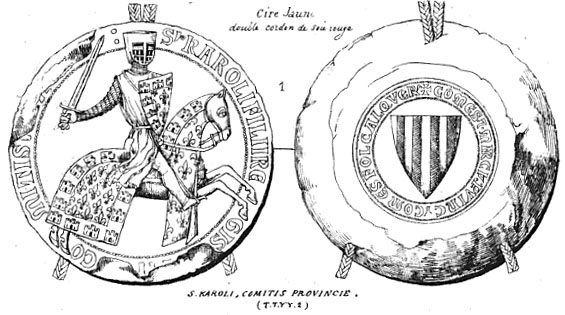
Seal of Charles from 1248 as Count of Provence. The seal shows Charles mounted and armed, the horse wearing his original arms with the castle of Castile and Charles himself carrying the shield of the same. The reverse shows the arms of Provence from his wife, the coat of arms of the House of Barcelona & Aragon.

Arms of Robert d'Artois

Arms of Alphonse de Poitiers

1st arms of Charles of France before Anjou, the castles representing his mother, Blanche of Castile

The arms that Charles had were changed sometime on or after 1246 to the ones below, the arms of his paternal France, the fleur-de-lys with a simple red label. The label is most commonly depicted with 3 tabs, but can be seen with 4 or 5 tabs. He was not the first to use these arms. His uncle Philippe le Hurepel, count of Clermont used them until his death in 1234. Charles was invested by the Pope as King of Sicily in June 1265, and crowned by 5 cardinals on 5 January 1266 in opposition to the Hohenstaufen king, Manfred of Sicily. The newer arms can be seen in the contemporary illustration of Charles battling Manfred for control of the Kingdom of Sicily at the Battle of Benevento on 26 February 1266, where he carries his newer arms on his shield, the shields of his soldiers, and his pennant. Manfred's troops carry the while eagle alluding to the imperial Hohenstaufens.

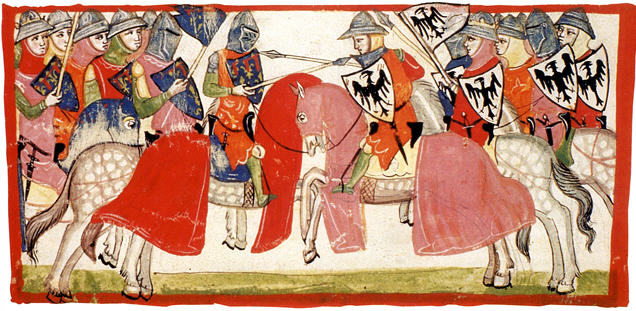
Clash between the troops of Charles of Anjou and those of Manfred of Sicily in the battle of Benevento. Miniature from the Nova Cronica.

2nd Arms of Charles of France as Count of Anjou and Maine

same with 4 points

Same with 5 points

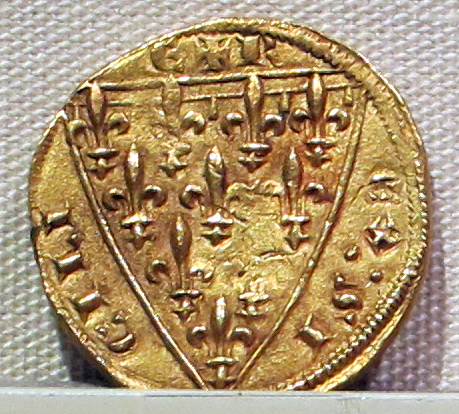
A gold Carolino struck by Charles during his reign, showing his arms with a 5-pointed label

When Charles became King, he started minting coinage with his arms on it. An example is shown below. Charles also felt that he inherited the Hohenstaufen claim to the Kingdom of Jerusalem, symbolized by Charles impaling the arms of Jerusalem with his own. This was shown in several different versions:

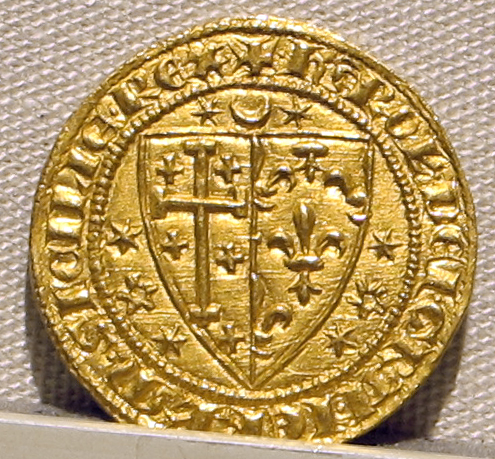
Carolino struck by Charles 1278–1285, showing the arms of Jerusalem impaled with the arms of France

Arms of the Kingdom of Jerusalem. They were the only arms allowed to put a metal (or) on another (argent).

Charles I and Joan I of Naples

Coat of Arms of Charles I of Anjou (per pale Jerusalem and France Ancient)

Charles II of Anjou and Sicily (Naples)

Coat of Arms of Robert the Wise (Jerusalem dimidiating Anjou Ancient)
Coat of Arms of Charles Martel of Anjou-Hungary (according to a fresco in the town hall of San Gimignano, Tuscany)

Coat of Arms of Charles Martel of Anjou-Hungary (according to the sculpture placed on his tomb in the Cathedral of Naples)

Charles' son and successor Charles II of Naples married the heiress of Hungary. Their son Charles Martel quartered France ancien with the arms of the Hungarian Royal Árpád dynasty to symbolize their claim. Charles Martel's son Charles Robert became Hungarian King and impaled the Angevin arms with Hungary. His son, Louis I the Great carried this through to his arms when he ruled Poland.

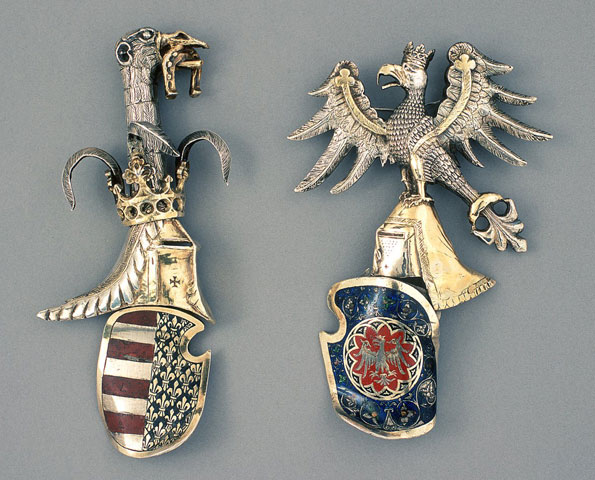
Hungarian coat of arms with Angevin helmet and Polish Coat of Arms (1340s)

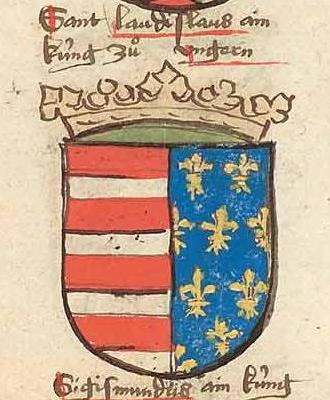
House of Anjou-Hungary (Chronicle of the Council of Constance)

Arms of Hungary (ancient)

Coat of Arms of Mary of Hungary (Árpád dynasty)

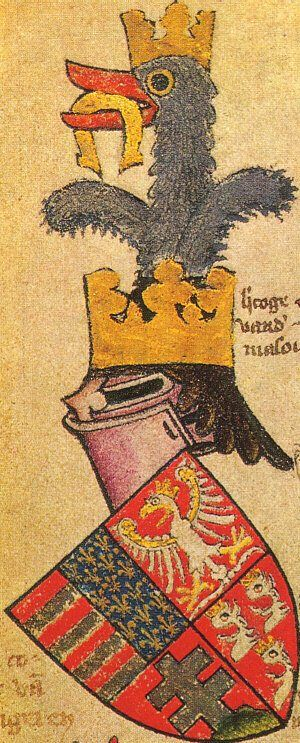
Louis I of Hungary and Poland's arms from the Gelre Armorial

Charles Martel of Hungary

King Charles Robert of Hungary

Coat of Arms of Louis I of Hungary

Patriarchal cross for Hungary formalized by Louis I seen in the modern Coat of arms of Hungary and here

Another version of the Patriarchal cross as seen here and here

King Louis the Great of Hungary and Poland

As seen above, when Louis I of Hungary died without male heirs, Charles III of Naples, considered himself the heir to the Hungarian throne as the senior Angevin male and male descendant of the Arpads. He added the arms of Hungary to Jerusalem and Anjou, coming up with the tripartite arms. He had some success, but as seen above he was assassinated and his son, Ladislaus of Naples never became King of Hungary.

Charles III ad Count of Durazzo

Charles III as Count of Durazzo, alt.

Coat of Arms of Charles III, Ladislaus, and Johanna II of Naples

Version without the red label

Alt. arms of Charles III

These arms were inherited by the House of Valois-Anjou when Johanna I adopted Louis of France, Duke of Anjou, great-great-grandson of Charles II through female line, as her heir.

The house also had some cadet lines that never became king:

Arms of Philippe de Tarente and his heirs, the princes of Taranto

Arms of Croatia, Dalmatia and Slavonia used by Stephen and John of Anjou as Duke of Slavonia

Coat of arms of Robert of Tarente, titular emperor of Constantinople, and his heirs

Coat of arms of Jean d'Anjou, duke of Durazzo and the cadet line of Durazzo that succeeded as kings of Naples

== Sources ==
- Abulafia, David, ed. (1999). The New Cambridge Medieval History, Volume 5, c.1198–c.1300. Cambridge: Cambridge University Press. ISBN 978-1-13905573-4.
- Fine, John V. A. (1994) [1987]. The Late Medieval Balkans: A Critical Survey from the Late Twelfth Century to the Ottoman Conquest. Ann Arbor, Michigan: University of Michigan Press. ISBN 978-0-472-10079-8.
- Geanakoplos, Deno John (1975). "Byzantium and the Crusades, 1261–1354". In Setton, Kenneth M.; Hazard, Harry W. (eds.). A History of the Crusades, Volume III: The Fourteenth and Fifteenth Centuries. Vol. 3. Madison and London: University of Wisconsin Press. pp. 27–68. ISBN 0-299-06670-3.
