= Louis of Gravina =

Coat of arms of Louis of Durazzo.

Louis of Durazzo (1324 – 22 July 1362) was Count of Gravina and Morrone. He was the son of John of Durazzo and Agnes of Périgord.

In 1337, he was named Vicar- and Captain-General of the Kingdom of Albania. During the ascension of the Durazzeschi at the court of Naples during the reign of Joanna I, he was one of the royal ambassadors to the Roman Curia. Upon the invasion of Louis I of Hungary and the execution of his elder brother, Charles, Duke of Durazzo, in 1348, he was imprisoned, with his younger brother Robert of Durazzo, until 1352. The rest of his life was spent stirring up revolts against Joanna in Apulia with the aid of some Free Companions. These were ultimately quashed in 1360 by Louis of Taranto, and Louis of Durazzo was imprisoned in the Castel dell'Ovo in Naples and murdered by poison.

== Family ==
He married Margaret of Sanseverino in 1343, by whom he had three children:

1. Louis (1344–d. young)
2. Charles III of Naples (1345–1386)
3. Agnes (1347–d. young)

== Sources ==
- Casteen, Elizabeth (2015). From She-Wolf to Martyr: The Reign and Disputed Reputation of Johanna I of Naples. Cornell University Press.
- Zacour, Norman P. (1960). "Talleyrand: The Cardinal of Périgord (1301–1364)". Transactions of the American Philosophical Society. New Series. 50 (7): 1–83. doi:10.2307/1005798. JSTOR 1005798.

Preceded by John	Count of Gravina; 1336–1362	Succeeded by Charles
