= Duke of Transylvania =

Hungarian honorific in the high middle ages

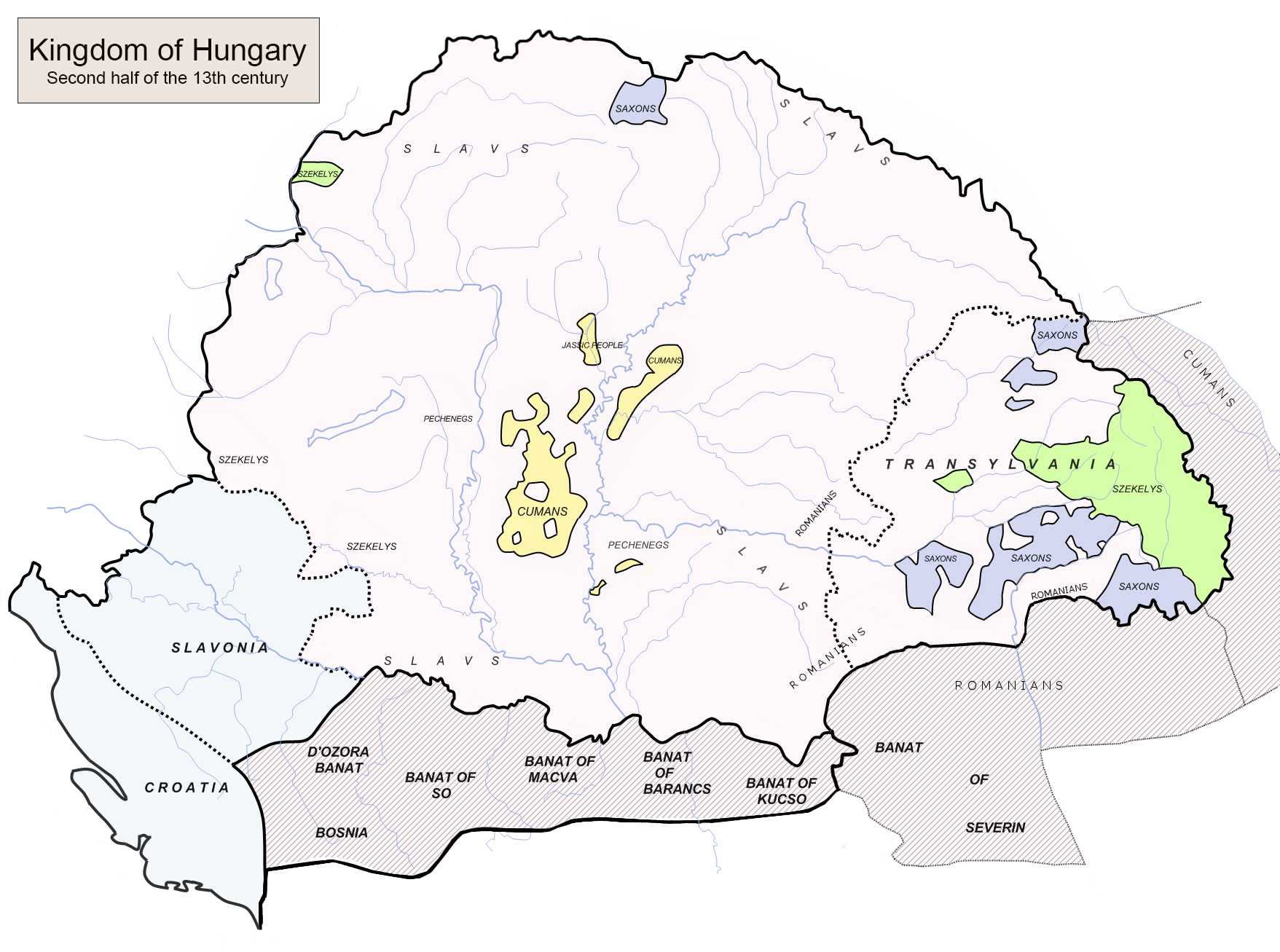
Kingdom of Hungary in the late 13th century

The Duke of Transylvania (Hungarian: erdélyi herceg; Latin: dux Transylvaniae) was a title of nobility four times granted to a son or a brother of the Hungarian monarch. The dukes of the first and second creations, Béla (1226–1235) and Stephen (1257–1258 or 1259, 1260–1270) of the Árpád dynasty were in fact viceroys with significant authority in Transylvania. The duke of the third creation, Louis, did not administer the province. The fourth duke, Stephen of the Anjou dynasty (1350–1351) did not play any significant role in politics.

== History ==
=== Duke Béla ===
Transylvania was an eastern "borderland" (Florin Curta) of the medieval Kingdom of Hungary from the early 11th century. Exposed to attacks by the Cumans and other neighboring nomadic tribes, a high-ranking official especially assigned to this task by the monarch, styled voivode administered the province from the last decades of the 12th century. Transylvania experienced a steady demographic growth from the 1150s, to which the immigration of new settlers from Western Europe contributed.

First King Andrew II of Hungary (1205–1235) considered to employ the Teutonic Knights both to defend the remote province of his kingdom and to stimulate the conversion of the pagan Cumans. For this purpose, he granted the knights the Burzenland (Barcaság, Bârsei) region of Transylvania in 1211. The Cumans only became receptive to the idea of conversion after 1223. Suffering a severe defeat in the battle on the river Kalka by the Mongols in that year, they had to take into consideration the threat of a new Mongol invasion thereafter.

Having noticed the Teutonic Knights' attempt to get rid of royal authority by accepting the suzerainty of the Holy See, King Andrew II expelled them by force from his kingdom in 1225. Meanwhile, the monarch had issued a charter to summarize the privileges of a significant group of the descendants of colonists from Western Europe. According to the Diploma Andreanum of 1224, the Transylvanian Saxons were exempted of the authority of the voivodes. Likewise, the existence of a royal official, the Count of the Székelys proves that the Hungarian-speaking Székelys were also administered independently of the voivodes from the 1220s at the latest.

King Andrew II appointed his eldest son, Béla duke of Transylvania in 1226. Already a "junior king" crowned in 1214, the newly created duke had earlier administered Slavonia with the same title. As duke of Transylvania, Béla became responsible for the expansion of the kingdom over the Carpathian Mountains (Florin Curta). This included the protection of the missionary work carried out among the western Cuman tribes primarily by Dominican friars.

Indeed, a Cuman chieftain named Boricius voluntarily converted to Christianity in 1227. Next year Duke Béla accompanied Archbishop Robert of Esztergom to the lands of Boricius where a new bishopric was set up. The Cuman chieftains also accepted the authority of the king of Hungary, represented by the junior king in the region. Indeed, King Andrew and his son jointly confirmed the liberties of the Cuman chieftains and commoners in 1228 or 1229.

Sometime Duke Béla acted independently of his father, as it is demonstrated by his grant of tax exemption to Transylvanian knights in 1231 and by his donation of lands situated in Wallachia in 1233. Pope Gregory IX also urged Duke Béla to protect the interests of bishop of Cumania against Eastern Orthodox prelates who offered the Sacraments not only to the Romanian, but also to the German and Hungarian believers in his diocese. The junior king's duchy of Transylvania ceased to exist in 1235 when Béla inherited his father's throne.

=== Stephen, rex iunior ===
The second creation of the title is connected to the coming to age of Stephen, the elder son of King Béla IV of Hungary (Duke Béla of the previous creation). Likewise his father, Duke Stephen had already been crowned "junior king" by the time he was appointed to govern Transylvania in 1257, and he had also bore the title of duke of Slavonia. Although temporarily removed from the office between 1258 or 1259 and 1260, otherwise Stephen actively administered the territories assigned to him during his rule. He not only confirmed former privileges granted by his father or other monarchs, but granted new liberties and donated properties to his followers. From the same period, no charter issued by King Béla IV in relation with Transylvania has been preserved, implying that Duke Stephen run the administration of his territories without any royal interference.

=== Duke Louis ===
Louis received the title of duke of Transylvania from his father, Charles I in 1339, but he did not administer his province. His separate ducal court was first mentioned in a royal charter of 1340.

== List of dukes ==
=== First creation ===
| Duke | Portrait | Birth | Marriage(s) | Death |
|---|---|---|---|---|
| Béla; House of Árpád; 1226–1235 also: Duke of Slavonia (1220–1226), King of Hungary (1235–1270) | Béla, as crowned king | June 1206 son of Andrew II of Hungary and Gertrude of Merania | Maria Laskarina; 1220; 9 children | 3 May 1270 aged 63 |

=== Second creation ===
| Duke | Portrait | Birth | Marriage(s) | Death |
|---|---|---|---|---|
| Stephen; House of Árpád; 1257–1258 or 1259, 1260–1270 also: Duke of Slavonia (1246), Duke of Styria (1259–1260), King of Hungary (1270–1272) | Stephen is crowned junior king | 1239 son of Béla IV of Hungary and Maria Laskarina | Elizabeth the Cuman b. 1250; 7 children | 6 August 1272; Csepel Island aged 33 |

=== Third creation ===
| Duke | Portrait | Birth | Marriage(s) | Death |
|---|---|---|---|---|
| Louis; House of Anjou; 1339–1342 also: King of Hungary (1342–1382) | Louis's first royal seal | 5 March 1326 son of Charles I of Hungary and Elizabeth of Poland | 1st wife: Margaret of Bohemia; 1344; 2nd wife: Elizabeth of Bosnia; 1353; 3 daughters | 10 September 1382 aged 56 |

=== Fourth creation ===
| Duke | Portrait | Birth | Marriage(s) | Death |
|---|---|---|---|---|
| Stephen; House of Anjou; 1350–1351 also: Duke of Szepes and Sáros (1349–1350), Duke of Slavonia (1351–1354) | Stephen with his mother and brothers | 1332 son of Charles I of Hungary and Elisabeth of Poland | Margaret of Bavaria; 1350; 2 children | 9 August 1354 aged 22 |

== See also ==
- Gelou
- Gyula (title)
- Kingdom of Hungary in the Middle Ages
- Prince of Transylvania
- Transylvania in the Middle Ages
- Voivode of Transylvania
