= Duke Stephen =

Dukes named Stephen include:

- Stephen, Duke of Slavonia (1332–1354), an Angevin prince
- Stephen I, Duke of Bavaria (1271–1310)
- Stephen II, Duke of Bavaria (1319–1375)
- Stephen III, Duke of Bavaria (1337–1413)
- Stjepan Vukčić Kosača (1404–1466), Bosnian nobleman of the House of Kosača
