= Margaret of Bavaria (disambiguation) =

Margaret of Bavaria may refer to:

- Margaret of the Palatinate (1376–1434)
- Margaret of Bavaria, Duchess of Slavonia (1321–1374)
- Margaret of Bavaria, Duchess of Burgundy (1363–1423)
- Margaret of Bavaria, Marquise of Mantua (1442–1479)
- Margaret of Bavaria, Electress Palatine (1456–1501)
