= Elizabeth of Slavonia =

Hungarian princess and titular Latin empress (born 1352)

Latin Empress consort of Constantinople
- Tenure: October 1370 – 25 November 1374
- Born: 1352
- Died: before 1380
- Spouse: Philip II, Prince of Taranto
- Issue: Philip
- House: Capetian House of Anjou
- Father: Stephen, Duke of Slavonia
- Mother: Margaret of Bavaria

Elizabeth of Slavonia (1352 – before 1380), was the heir presumptive to the Hungarian throne between 1360 and 1370.

Elizabeth was the only daughter of Stephen, Duke of Slavonia, a younger son of the Hungarian king Charles I, and member of the Hungarian branch of the Capetian House of Anjou. Her mother was Margaret of Bavaria, and her only known sibling was John, Duke of Slavonia (1354–1360). Elizabeth was regarded as heir presumptive to the throne of Hungary after the death of her brother, as her uncle Louis I had no children. Charles IV, Holy Roman Emperor, wanted her to marry his eldest son, Wenceslaus. However, the marriage negotiations were ended in 1370, when a daughter named Catherine was born to Elizabeth's uncle. Catherine was followed by two sisters, which meant that Elizabeth would not inherit the Holy Crown of Hungary.

In October 1370, Elizabeth married Philip II, Prince of Taranto, a 41-year-old widower and pretender to the Latin Empire. Philip had survived his children by his previous marriage and was in need of heirs. As her dower, Elizabeth was granted Corfu as a personal fief. Their only known child, a son named Philip, was born in 1371 and died the same year. Elizabeth was widowed on 25 November 1374. She appears to have died before the end of the 1380s.

Titles in pretence
| Preceded by Maria of Calabria | — TITULAR — Latin Empress consort of Constantinople; 1370–1374; Reason for succession failure: Conquest by Empire of Nicaea in 1261 | Succeeded by Agnes of Durazzo |
