= John of Anjou =

Hungarian prince (1354–1360)

John
- Duke of Croatia, Dalmatia and Slavonia
- Born: 1354
- Died: 1360 (aged 5–6)
- House: Capetian House of Anjou
- Father: Stephen of Anjou
- Mother: Margaret of Bavaria
- Religion: Roman Catholicism

John (Hungarian: János; 1354–1360) was a Hungarian royal prince of the Capetian House of Anjou. He was the only son of Stephen of Anjou, Duke of Croatia, Dalmatia and Slavonia, and Margaret of Bavaria. He inherited his father's duchies shortly after his birth. He was regarded the heir to his sonless uncle, Louis I of Hungary, who also secured John's right to inherit Poland from Casimir III of Poland. Both Louis I and Casimir III survived John who died prematurely.

== Birth ==
John was the only son of Stephen of Anjou and Margaret of Bavaria. Stephen was the youngest son of Charles I of Hungary. In Hungary, Stephen was regarded the heir to his sonless eldest brother, Louis I of Hungary, but the Polish noblemen forbade Stephen to interfere in Polish affairs when they confirmed, in 1351, Louis's right to inherit Poland from his maternal uncle, Casimir III of Poland. John's mother was the daughter of the Holy Roman Emperor, Louis IV. She came to Hungary in the autumn of 1350.

The date and place of John's birth are unknown. His father was staying in Zagreb when John was born, according to his mother's charter of grant to the Zagreb Chapter. Stephen of Anjou did not visit Zagreb in 1351 and 1352. John's sister, Elizabeth, was born most probably in 1353. Consequently, John must have been born in late 1353 or in 1354, according to historian Éva B. Halász. Stephen had already received Croatia, Dalmatia and Slavonia from Louis I.

== Duke ==
Stephen died on 9 August 1354. John inherited his father's provinces under the guardianship of his mother. He was regarded the heir to Louis I who also persuaded Casimir III of Poland to adopt John in 1355. Not independently of the war with Venice, Louis I appointed a lieutenant to rule Slavonia in the spring of 1356, and a ban to administer Croatia and Dalmatia in 1357. John, nevertheless, was styled duke of Slavonia, Croatia and Dalmatia in 1358. He died in 1360.

== Sources ==
- B. Halász, Éva (2016). "Anjou István herceg (1332–1354)". In Zsoldos, Attila (ed.). Hercegek és hercegségek a középkori Magyarországon [Dukes and Dukedoms in Medieval Hungary] (in Hungarian). Városi Levéltár és Kutatóintézet. pp. 81–93. ISBN 978-963-8406-13-2.
- Csukovits, Enikő (1994). "Stephen 7.". In Kristó, Gyula; Engel, Pál; Makk, Ferenc (eds.). Korai magyar történeti lexikon (9–14. század) [Encyclopedia of the Early Hungarian History (9th–14th centuries)] (in Hungarian). Akadémiai Kiadó. p. 294. ISBN 963-05-6722-9.
- Engel, Pál (2001). The Realm of St Stephen: A History of Medieval Hungary, 895–1526. I.B. Tauris Publishers. ISBN 1-86064-061-3.
- Knoll, Paul W. (1972). The Rise of the Polish Monarchy: Piast Poland in East Central Europe, 1320–1370. The University of Chicago Press. ISBN 0-226-44826-6.

John of Hungary House of Anjou Cadet branch of the House of Capet Born: 1354 Died: 1360
Royal titles
Preceded by Stephen	Duke of Slavonia; 1354–1360	Vacant Title next held by John Corvinus
