= Brunissende of Foix =

- Countess of Périgord
- Died: September 1324; Montagnac d'Auberoche
- Buried: Convent of the Friars Minor, Périgueux
- Spouses: Elias VII, Count of Périgord
- Issue: Cardinal Hélie de Talleyrand-Périgord; Agnes, Duchess of Durazzo; Archambaud IV, Count of Périgord; Roger-Bernard, Count of Périgord; Rosemburge de Lavie
- Father: Roger-Bernard III, Count of Foix
- Mother: Margaret, Viscountess of Béarn

Brunissende of Foix (died September 1324) was Countess of Périgord by marriage to Count Elias VII. She served as regent of the County of Périgord during the minority of her son from 1311.

According to several sources, Brunissende had influence in the politics of the newly formed Avignon Papacy due to her close relationship with Pope Clement V. This arrangement supposedly enabled Brunissende to ensure a clerical career for her son, Hélie, who would go on to have an influential career as a cardinal.

== Biography ==
Brunissende was the daughter of Roger-Bernard III, Count of Foix by his wife Margaret, Viscountess of Béarn.

=== Countess of Périgord ===
Brunissende married Elias in 1298. For the groom, this was his second marriage due to the death of his first wife, Philippa, in 1286. Brunissende's family provided her with a dowry of 6,000 livres. She and Elias had several children, Hélie, Archambaud, and Roger-Bernard. Amongst her daughters were Rosemburge and Agnes.

Brunissende was rumoured to be the mistress of Clement V, yet Giovanni Villani confessed that stories he had heard of the relationship between her and the Pope were only hearsay. Zacour was certain that Brunissende had met the Pope when he had visited Périgueux and the Périgords were close allies of the French king, to whom the Pope was indebted to.

=== Regency and death ===
In 1311, Brunissende was widowed. Due to Archambaud being underage, she assumed the regency over the County of Périgord. During this period, her ties with the Avignon Papacy strengthened. The favours to Hélie did not stop when her husband died. On January 23, 1314, he was made canon in the Church of Cahors, with reservation of a prebend. This certainly implies some form of communication between the Pope and Brunissende, Zacour claimed that the favour was a result of Brunissende's request; as she was regent at the time, it seems logical to have come from her.

Brunissende probably died at Montagnac d'Auberoche, where her last will and testament was drawn up on Sunday, September 30, 1324. Her funeral saw one of the many dramatic episodes in the long, futile struggle of the counts of Perigord with the independent townsmen of Perigueux. Her body was brought to Perigueux for burial in the convent of the Friars Minor, it was accompanied by her three sons, her daughters and a host of noble ladies, barons, and knights, all of whom lodged in the Franciscan convent.

== Bibliography ==
- Ward, Jennifer, Women in Medieval Europe 1200-1500 (London: Routledge, 2016)
- Zacour, Norman P. (1960). "Talleyrand: The Cardinal of Périgord (1301-1364)". Transactions of the American Philosophical Society. 50 (7). American Philosophical Society. doi:10.2307/1005798. JSTOR 1005798.
