= Hélie de Talleyrand-Périgord (cardinal) =

French cardinal

Cardinal Hélie de Talleyrand-Périgord
- Cardinal-Priest; Cardinal-Bishop
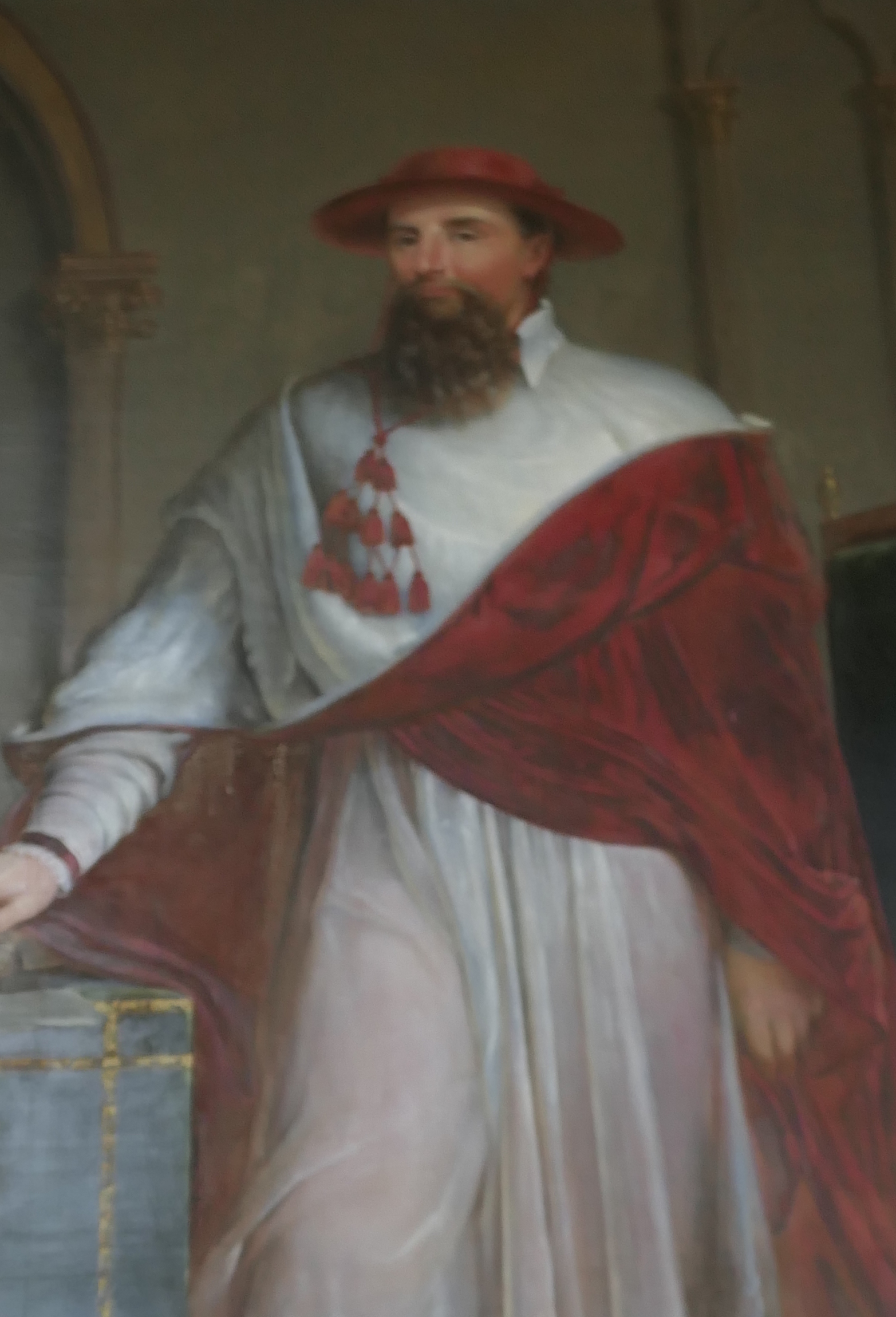
- Church: San Pietro in Vincoli (1331-1348)
- Diocese: Albano (1348-1364)

Orders
- Created cardinal: 25 May 1331 by Pope John XXII

Personal details
- Born: 1301 Périgueux, FR
- Died: 17 January 1364 (aged 62–63) Avignon, FR
- Buried: Cathedral of Périgueux
- Parents: Elias VII, Count of Périgord; Brunissende of Foix
- Occupation: cleric, diplomat
- Education: Civil Law
- Alma mater: Orleans
- Coat of arms

Hélie de Talleyrand-Périgord (1301 – 17 January 1364) was a French cardinal, from one of the most aristocratic families in Périgord, south-west France. Hélie became a major figure in the Avignon papacy, and also a diplomat engaged in the negotiations of the Hundred Years' War, having friendships in both English and French royal families. In his last months he had been appointed Papal Legate for a crusade against the Turks.

== Family ==
Hélie was born at Périgueux, third son of Elias VII, Count of Périgord, and Brunissende of Foix, daughter of Roger Bernard III, comte de Foix. His elder brothers were Archambaud (IV), who inherited the County, and Roger-Bernard (who married Eleanor, daughter of Bouchard, Comte de Vendôme); his younger brother was Fortanier, and his sisters were Agnes (who married John of Sicily Duke of Durazzo and de Gravina in 1321), Jeanne (who married Ponce, Seigneur de Castillon), Marguerite (who married Éméric de Lautrec), and Rosemburge (who married Jacques de Lavie, grand-nephew of Pope John XXII). As a third son Hélie was destined for an ecclesiastical career. His brother, Roger Bernard, too, had an ecclesiastical career, becoming Canon of Lyon. But then, the eldest son died, and Roger-Bernard became the Count of Périgord.

== Bishoprics ==
In 1308, at the age of six, Hélie was granted a Canonry in Agen, for which Pope Clement V granted him special dispensation. He was probably educated at first in the local school of the cathedral of Périgueux, but in 1320 he was granted permission by Pope John XXII to study Civil Law for five years, even though he was primicerius in the Church of Metz. He may have studied at Toulouse, though there is no direct evidence. Early in his career Hélie became Abbot Commendatory of the Abbey of Chancelade in the diocese of Périgueux, with which the family had long been connected. At the age of twenty-three Hélie de Talleyrand, who was already Canon of Périgueux and Archdeacon of Richmond in the Church of Lincoln, was appointed Bishop of Limoges, which was approved by Pope John XXII on 10 October 1324. He held the diocese until 1328. It appears, however, that he was never consecrated during his years as bishop of Limoges. If he had been consecrated, as Zacour points out, he would have had to resign his other benefices, which might have proved financially disadvantageous.

Then, on 4 January 1328 his translation to the diocese of Auxerre was approved. It is said that he was consecrated bishop by Pope John XXII himself. In 1330 Bishop de Talleyrand founded the Chartreuse de Vauclaire. This was allegedly at the command of the King of France, in reparation for outrages committed against a Franciscan convent on the outskirts of Périgueux by Talleyrand's eldest brother Archambeau, Count of Périgord, at the time of their mother's funeral in October 1324. Talleyrand held the diocese of Auxerre until he became a cardinal in 1331. His successor was approved on 24 January 1332.

== Cardinal ==
Cardinal Talleyrand's arms

In a Consistory held for the promotion of cardinals on 25 May 1331, Pope John XXII appointed one and only one cardinal, Hélie de Talleyrand, as a Cardinal-Priest. This was at the request of King Philip VI of France, on the recommendation of Étienne de Mornay, Maître des Comptes and former Chancellor. The appointment caused a good deal of friction between the King and the Pope. Philip had asked for two cardinals, which the Pope was quite unwilling to grant. Though he did elevate Talleyrand, Pope John sent off a tart letter to the King on 25 May, the day after he had approved the promotion. He pointed out that the College of Cardinals was already well supplied with the talents required by the Church. Moreover, the Papacy had not been deaf to the requests of the French kings. Of the twenty current cardinals, thirteen were subjects of the King of France. Nonetheless, with the consent of those cardinals (or perhaps one should say 'pressure from'), he had agreed to promote Bishop Talleyrand. The Pope's complaints seem to have fallen on deaf ears, for the royal family were again begging for more cardinals in September. This time, on 26 September, the Pope wrote to Queen Joanna. He reminded the Queen of the rules observed in the Roman Curia. Appointments were never made in private, only in open Consistory, with votes of the current cardinals heard; appointments were made only for good reason, when the number of cardinals had fallen too low, or when there was an insufficiency in talent in theology or Canon Law, neither of which was the case at the present moment. In fact the number of cardinals was excessively high, and there was talent aplenty. She should also consider that there were now sixteen cardinals of French extraction, and only six Italians. He therefore refused the royal request. The pressure continued, however, and on 20 December 1331 yet another French cardinal, Pierre Bertrand, was appointed.

Of the two names put forward, Talleyrand was the less undesirable choice. He was smart, he had studied the law, and he was a relative by marriage of the Pope. This may also explain the Pope's indulgence in allowing Talleyrand to keep the diocese of Auxerre until 22 July 1332, to finance his move to Avignon.

He signed at least two papal bulls on 25 May and 22 June, but not with the name of a titular church, indicating that one had not yet been assigned. When one was assigned, he became the Cardinal-Priest of S. Pietro in Vincoli. He made his official appearance in Avignon in the third week of July 1331, at which time there was a banquet with the Pope and Cardinals in his honor.

=== Death of John XXII and Conclave of 1334 ===
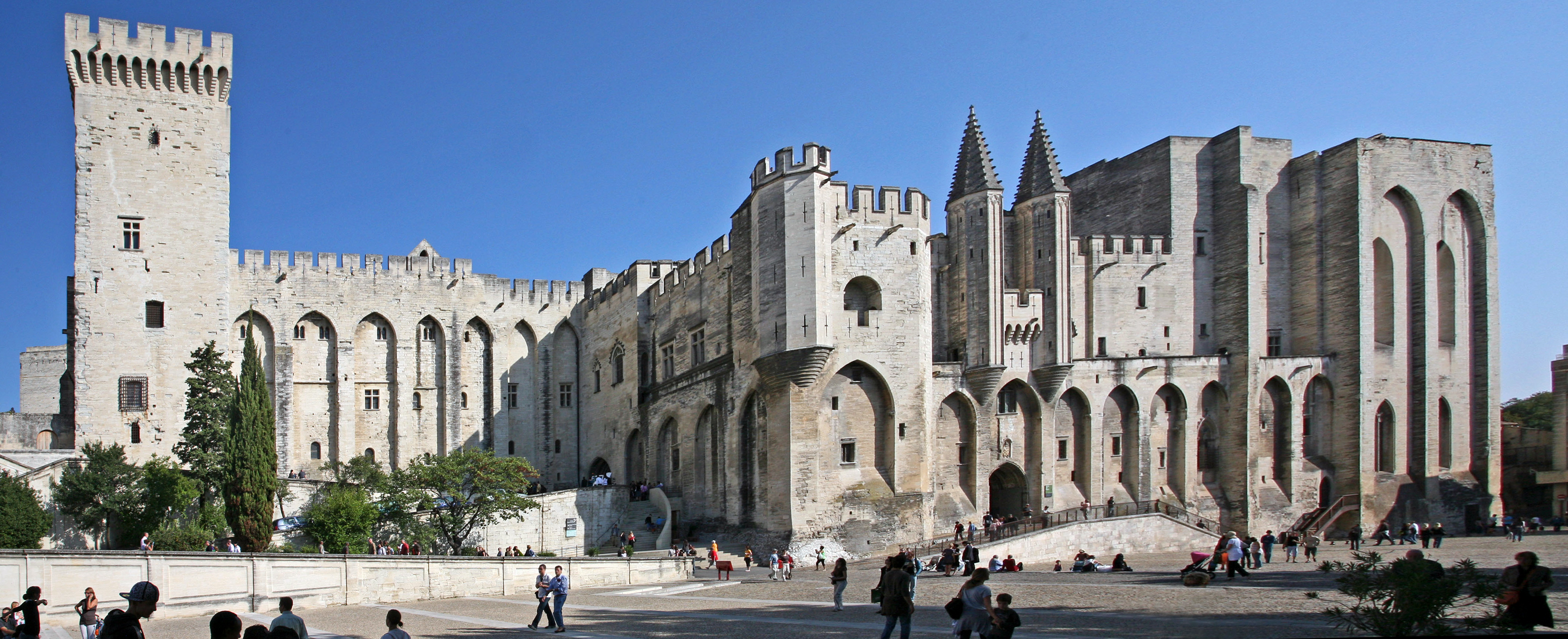
Palace of the Popes, Avignon

Pope John XXII died on Sunday 4 December 1334. The day before, the Pope had a bedside meeting with the Cardinals in Avignon; his successor provides a list of the twenty cardinals, including Talleyrand de Périgord, who were present. Four cardinals were not present, Napoleone Orsini and Giovanni Gaetano Orsini among them. It was at this meeting that the Pope recanted his notions about the beatific vision, which had so unsettled Christendom.

The Conclave opened on 13 December 1334. The early discussions were not about a particular candidate, but about the need to extract a promise from all the candidates that the new Pope would move the Roman Curia back to Rome. John XXII had made promises in that direction, and his failure, with one excuse after another, seriously angered the senior Italian cardinal, Napoleone Orsini. Cardinal Napoleone therefore led a group of cardinals who were demanding a return to Rome. Cardinal Hélie de Talleyrand led a group of French cardinals who were just as determined to keep the Curia in Avignon. According to Giovanni Villani, the cardinals led by Talleyrand thought that they had found a pope in Cardinal Jean-Raymond de Comminges. But when he was approached and asked to take the oath that was being demanded, he refused. Finally, on 20 December 1334, a sufficient number of votes was accumulated by the Cistercian Cardinal Jacques Fournier, who became Pope Benedict XII.

In 1336 King Philip VI of France was in Avignon, and a crusade was agreed on. Four cardinals took the cross on that occasion: Annibaldo di Ceccano, Hélie de Talleyrand, Gauscelin de Jean Duèse, and Bertrand du Pouget. None of them ever made the trip. In the summer of 1340, the King authorized the two parties in a dispute between the Count of Foix and the Monastery of Lézat to choose their own arbitrators; one of those chosen was Cardinal de Talleyrand.

Talleyrand had been assigned by Pope Benedict XII, probably in 1341, as Auditor to hear the case of Lampredius, Bishop of Trau, who refused to cooperate with the proceedings. Talleyrand declared him contumacious and suspended him from office. But then Pope Benedict died. The new pope, Clement VI, supported Talleyrand, however, and renewed the suspension, authorizing the Subdeacon of Trau, Desa Andreae, to assume the spiritual and temporal direction of the diocese.

In 1346, Cardinal de Talleyrand negotiated the purchase of the castle of Albarupe (Auberoche) in Périgord from the Duke and Duchess of Brittany, which had belonged to their nephew the Count of Limoges but which had been occupied by enemies of the king by stealth and betrayal. The Duke and Duchess were eager to see the Castle in responsible hands, and so they sold it to the brother of the Count of Périgord.

In 1347, Cardinal de Talleyrand founded the Chapel of S. Antoine in the Cathedral of Saint Front de Périgueux. It was to be served by twelve chaplains, appointed by the Cathedral Chapter on the recommendation of the Counts of Périgord. The action was approved by Pope Clement VI in a bull of 26 June 1347. In his Testament he left the chaplains 150 gold florins.

On 4 November 1348 Pope Clement VI promoted Cardinal de Talleyrand to be Cardinal-Bishop of Albano (1348-1364), and, in 1361 seniority made him Dean of the College of Cardinals (1361-1364), following the death of Cardinal Pierre de Pratis (des Près).

=== Conclave of 1352 ===
Pope Clement died in Avignon on 6 December 1352. The Conclave to elect his successor opened on Sunday 16 December 1352 in the Apostolic Palace in Avignon, with twenty-six cardinals in attendance, including Hélie de Talleyrand and his enemy, Guy de Boulogne. At mid-morning on 18 December they elected Cardinal Étienne Aubert, who took the name Innocent VI. He was crowned on 30 December 1352.

== Benefices ==
A list of Talleyrand's benefices has been worked out through the scholarly efforts of Norman Zacour, which includes a large number of Canonries and Prebends. In addition to what Zacour has listed, it may be stated that Talleyrand was Canon of Gerona.

From 1320 to 1323 Hélie de Talleyrand served as Archdeacon of London. From 1322 to 1328 he was Archdeacon of Richmond, from 1342 to 1345 Dean of York, and from 1357 to 1359 Archdeacon of Suffolk. He is also known to have held Whitchurch in the diocese of Canterbury as persona (parson), and was Prebend of Thame in the Church of Lincoln, in 1345.

== Peacemaker ==
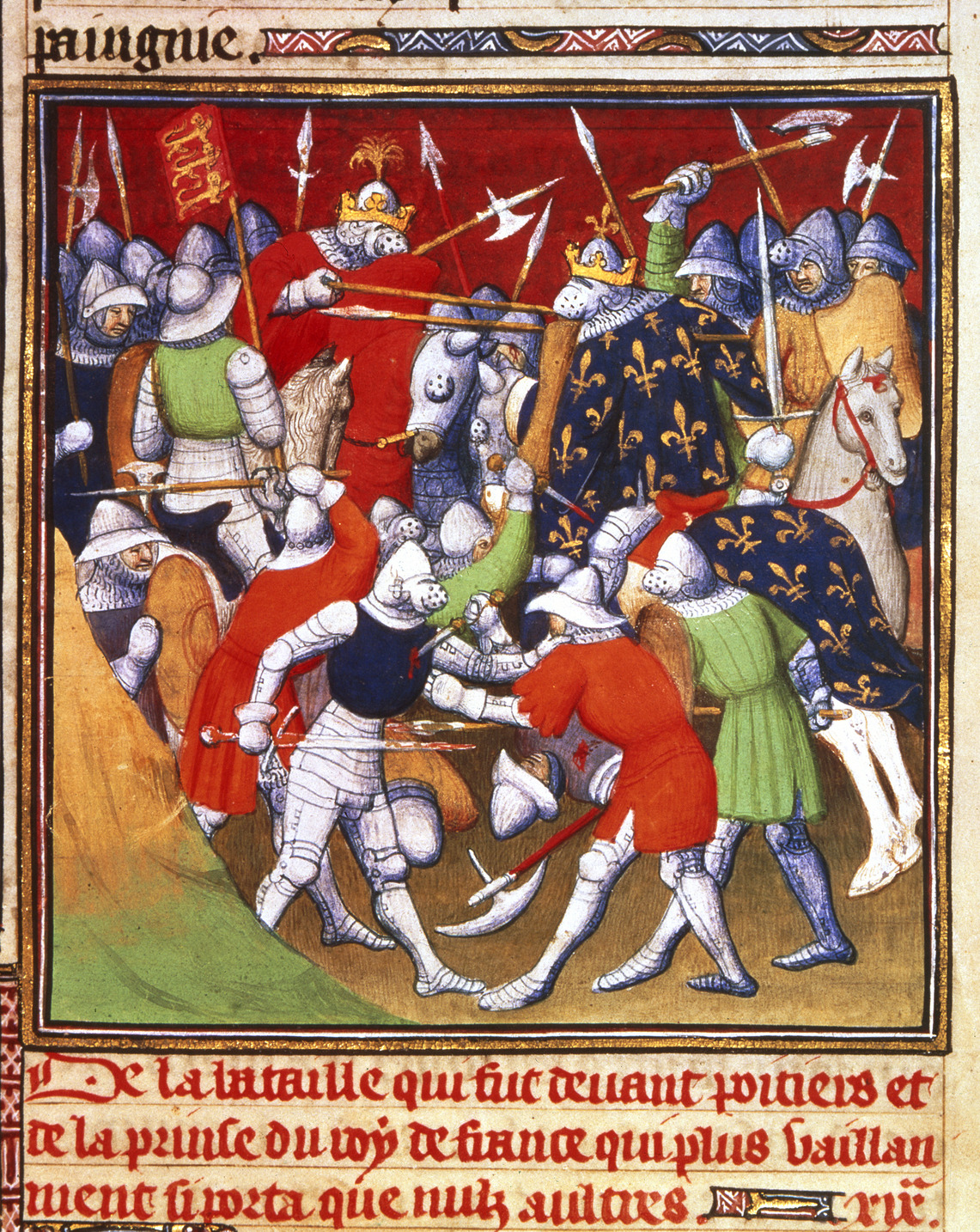
Battle of Poitiers, 1356

Cardinal Talleyrand and Cardinal Nicola Capocci were sent to France to attempt to negotiate a peace between France and England. They were in Paris just before the Battle of Poitiers on 19 September 1356. In the first week of October 1356 Pope Innocent VI wrote to Edward, Prince of Wales, the Black Prince, commending his generous conduct to King John II of France, who had been captured in the battle. In a separate letter the Pope asked the Prince to confer with Cardinal de Talleyrand and Cardinal Nicola Capocci in the interests of peace. Despite the need for a peace, the Pope sent Cardinal Talleyrand as part of the delegation which travelled to Metz at Christmas time, for the Imperial Diet, to witness the promulgation of the famous Golden Bull of the Emperor Charles IV. In the following year, after intense negotiations, the papal negotiators travelled to London for a conference with King Edward. They arrived on 2 July 1347, and were received by the King. Negotiations continued, but no solution was reached. In 1348 the two cardinals arranged a treaty between Charles King of Navarre and Charles Duke of Normandy.

== Patronage ==
He was also a literary patron, promoting the writing of the 1336 travels of William of Boldensele, whose real name was Otto de Nyenhusen. In his prefatory letter, written from Avignon on St. Michael's Day 1337, before his return to his monastery, Guilelmus writes, "And now it is fitting for me to stay for a few days more at my Lord Talleyrand de Perigord's in the Curia at Avignon, because my lord had graciously taken great pleasure from my arrival... I am sending you my little book which I put together at the insistence of my lord Cardinal...." He stayed more than a year.

Talleyrand also corresponded with Petrarch. He was detested, however, by the Florentine chronicler, Giovanni Villani, who was a Guelph and a republican.

== Later years ==
In 1359 Cardinal de Talleyrand was again appointed Legate to the Kings of France and England, and when he was returning to Avignon, he was the subject of a plot to attack and rob him while he was passing through the diocese of Langres. He himself was not taken, since he delayed his trip along the way, but his baggage was taken and plundered. He wrote a letter, ordering all the bishops of France to excommunicate the malefactors.

In 1359 Cardinal de Talleyrand, Cardinal Audouin Aubert, and Cardinal Raymond de Canilhac were appointed by Pope Innocent VI as assessors in a dispute between the Master of the Order of S. John of Jerusalem and the Castellan of Emposta. Assessors were judges appointed by the Pope in cases which came to the Roman Curia as part of the process of appeal; the assessors investigated and provided a judgment for the Pope's final review and implementation. They also investigated church elections to ensure that the person elected had been chosen in accordance with the rules of Canon Law and was a suitable person for the position.

Cardinal de Talleyrand drew up his Testament on 25 October 1360. He added a codicil on 16 January 1364, eleven days before his death, "sound in mind, but sick in body".

Cardinal de Talleyrand was at the height of his influence and power. In September 1362, after the death of Pope Innocent VI, the College of Cardinals was divided (according to Jean Froissart) into two factions, one supporting Guy of Boulogne and the other Hélie de Talleyrand. The two competitors were strong enough to ensure that the other could not be elected with the two-thirds majority required by Canon Law. In the end, the Cardinals had to go outside the College of Cardinals, and a compromise candidate was elected, Abbot Guillaume Grimoald of S. Vincent in Marseille, who was Legate of the Apostolic See in the Kingdom of Sicily, and was not present at the Conclave. He was not even a cardinal. The decision was taken perhaps on September 28, but it was not made public until the day after the arrival of Abbot Grimoald in Avignon, 31 October. After he had accepted election, Grimoald was proclaimed Pope Urban V. Shortly after the election, Cardinal Talleyrand is said to have remarked to one of his familiars, "Now we have a pope. We honored other ones out of duty, but this one we have to fear and revere, because he is powerful in word and deed."

== Crusade and death ==
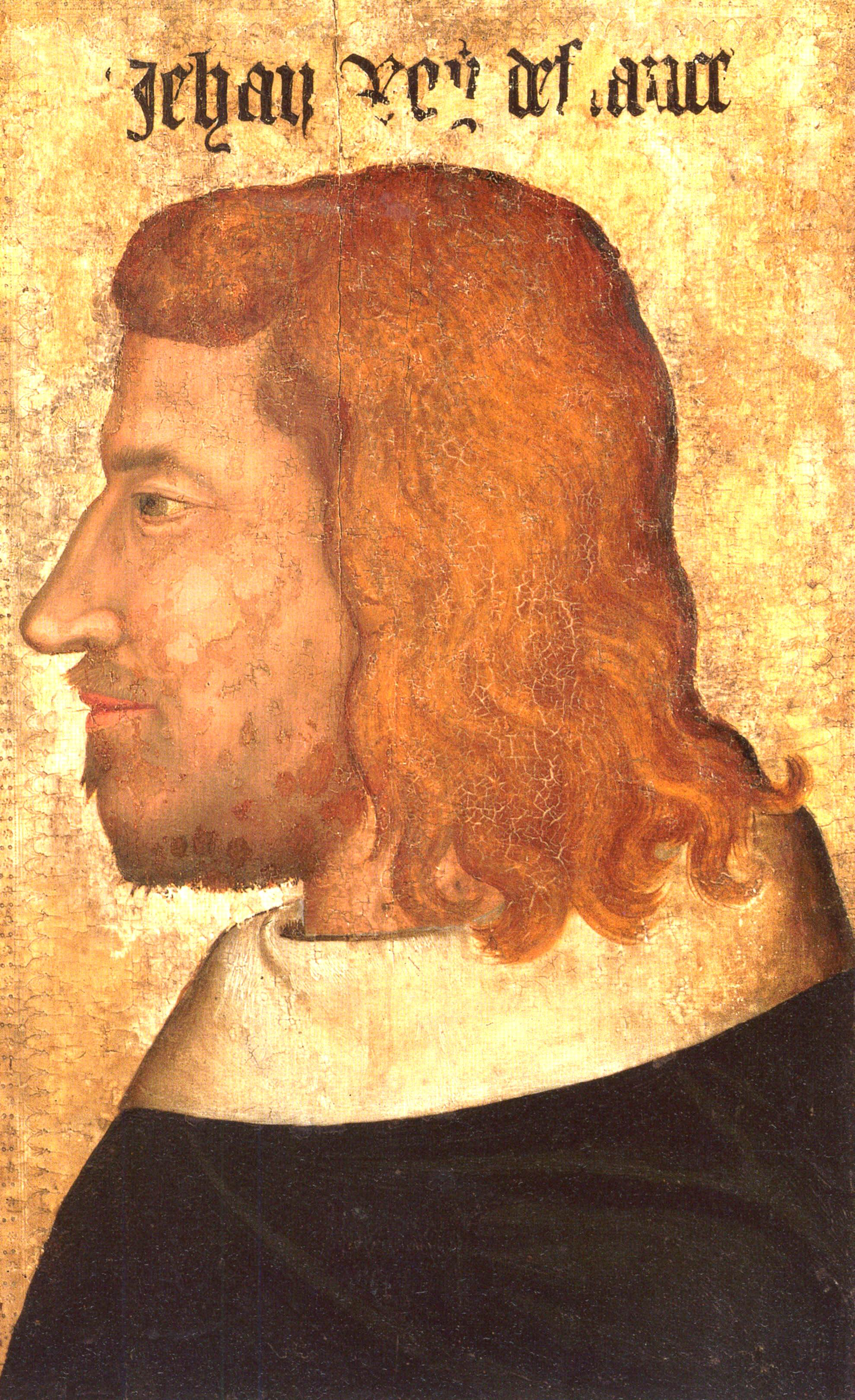
King John II of France

In May 1363, King John II of France wrote to Pope Urban, requesting that Cardinal de Talleyrand be sent on a legation to him. The Pope replied on 25 May, that the College of Cardinals did not think that it was appropriate for him to be sent just at that time, and so the Pope apologized for not being able to carry out the King's request. The request was sufficiently important that the Pope discussed it with the cardinals, and it is significant that he accepted their viewpoint. The reason for the request is unknown. Zacour conjectures that King John was finding opposition to the planned crusade, and wanted help; it is difficult to see how Talleyrand could have helped, or why the cardinals would refuse. Zacour also conjectures that the College of Cardinals did not authorize the mission because Talleyrand did not want it to, because he was more interested in his affairs in Naples; it is difficult to see how Talleyrand's influence could have outweighed that of King John and Pope Urban with the cardinals, especially in the matter of a crusade.

On 23 August 1363, in the Cathedral of S. Front de Périgord, Boson de Talleyrand, Seigneur de Grignols et de Chalais, swore fealty to the Prince of Wales in his capacity as Duke of Aquitaine.

In 1363, King John II of France and Peter I, the King of Cyprus, came to Avignon, and it was decided that there should be a war against the Turks. The Pope, Urban V held a special ceremony on Holy Saturday, 1363, and bestowed the crusader's cross on the two kings, and on Cardinal Talleyrand as well. John II was appointed Rector and Captain General of the expedition. Cardinal de Talleyrand was appointed Apostolic Legate for the expedition, but he died on 17 January 1364, before the expedition could set out. King John returned to prison in England and died in London on 8 April 1364.

Cardinal de Talleyrand's Testament stated that he wished to be buried in the Cathedral of Saint-Front in Périgueux, but, if he died at Avignon or its neighborhood, he wished to lie in state in the House of the Franciscans in Avignon, and then he wished his body to be transferred to Saint-Front. There is today no sign of his place of burial.

== Legacy: the Collège de Périgord ==
On 5 October 1375 Pope Gregory XI granted faculties to Cardinals Pierre de Salue de Monteruc and Jean de Cros to proceed with the organization and founding of the Collège de Périgord at Toulouse, for which Cardinal Talleyrand had provided in his Testament. As Pope Gregory ordered, based on Talleyrand's wishes, there were to be twenty students who were to be poor clerics; they were to be provided with four chaplains, and were to be served by seven domestics. Ten of the clerics were to study Civil Law, and ten were to study Canon Law. Ten of the students were to be chosen from the diocese of Périgueux, the other ten from elsewhere. They were chosen by the Count of Périgueux, and if he did not fill a vacancy within three months, the choice was to be made by the Chancellor of the University of Toulouse. Every candidate was subject to approval by the Chancellor and by a majority of the current students. The students could stay in the college from twelve to fifteen years, according to the statutes of the University of Toulouse for a doctorate in Law. The chaplains were chosen by the students. More than 34,000 livres tournois were invested on behalf of the College by the Cardinal's executors.

== In fiction ==
Cardinal Talleyrand is the protagonist of Maurice Druon's 1977 novel, The King Without a Kingdom (Quand un Roi perd la France in French), the final installment of The Accursed Kings series. The book is framed as Cardinal Talleyrand writing a letter to his nephew narrating his trip to mediate between the French and English before the Battle of Poitiers. He is portrayed as being conflicted between his admiration for the French crown but personal disdain for the weak King John and his grudging respect and apprehension of the formidable King and Prince Edward. He believes that if England were to take the role that France usually holds as the preeminent power of Europe, King Edward will distance his country from the church.

== Books and articles ==
- André, Jean François (1845). Histoire politique de la monarchie pontificale au XIVe siècle: ou, La papauté à Avignon (in French). Paris: Vaton.
- Baronio, Cesare (1872). Augustin Theiner (ed.). Annales ecclesiastici: A. D. 1-1571 denuo excusi et ad nostra usque tempora perducti ab Augustino Theiner (in Latin). Vol. Tomus vigesimus quartus (24). Paris: Typis et sumptibus Ludovici Guerin. [1313-1333]
- Baronio, Cesare (1872). Augustinus Theiner (ed.). Annales ecclesiastici: A. D. 1-1571 denuo excusi et ad nostra usque tempora perducti ab Augustino Theiner (in Latin). Vol. Tomus vigesimus quintus (25). Barri-Ducis: Typis et sumptibus Ludovici Guerin.[1333-1356]
- Baronio, Cesare (1872). Augustin Theiner (ed.). Annales ecclesiastici: A. D. 1-1571 denuo excusi et ad nostra usque tempora perducti ab Augustino Theiner. Vol. Tomus vigesimus sextus (26). [1356-1396]
- Baluze [Baluzius], Etienne [Stephanus] (1693). Vitae paparum Avenionensium, hoc est, Historia pontificum romanorum qui in Gallia sederunt ab anno Christi MCCCV. usque ad annum MCCCXCIV (in Latin). Vol. Tomus primus. Paris: apud Franciscum Muguet.
- Baluze, Etienne (1693). Vitae Paparum Avenionensium, Hoc est Historia Pontificum Romanorum qui in Gallia sederunt ab anno Christi MCCCV usque ad annum MCCCXCIV (in Latin). Vol. Tomus secundus. Paris: Muguet.
- Deluz, Christiane (1996). "Croisade et paix en Europe au XIVe siècle. Le rôle du cardinal Hélie de Talleyrand". Cahiers de Recherches Médiévales (XIII-XVe s.) (in French). 1: 53–64. doi:10.4000/crm.2515.
- Du Chesne, François (1660). Histoire De Tous Les Cardinaux François De Naissance (in French). Vol. Tome I. Paris: Aux despens de l' Autheur. pp. 465–470.
- Du Chesne, François (1660). Preuves de l' Histoire de tous les cardinaux François de naissance (in French and Latin). Paris: Aux despens de l'Autheur & se vendent chez luy. pp. 311–322.
- Eubel, Konrad (1898). Hierarchia catholica medii aevi: sive Summorum pontificum, S.R.E. cardinalium, ecclesiarum antistitum series ab anno 1198 usque ad annum [1605] perducta e documentis tabularii praesertim Vaticani collecta, digesta (in Latin). Vol. I. Münster: sumptibus et typis librariae Regensbergianae.
- Guillemain, Bernard (1962). La cour pontificale d'Avignon: (1309-1376) (in French). Paris: E. De Boccard.
- Meusnier, Maurice (1951). "Fondation et construction d'un collège universitaire au XIVe siècle : le collège de Périgord à Toulouse". Annales du Midi (in French). 63 (15): 211–220. doi:10.3406/anami.1951.5840.
- Pélissier, Antoine (1961). Innocent VI: le Réformateur; deuxième pape limousin (1352-1362) (in French). F. Layotte.
- Renouard, Yves (1970). The Avignon papacy, 1305-1403. Hamden CT USA: Archon Books. ISBN 978-0-208-01156-5.
- Rollo-Koster, Joëlle (2015). Avignon and Its Papacy, 1309–1417: Popes, Institutions, and Society. New York-London: Rowman & Littlefield Publishers. ISBN 978-1-4422-1534-4.
- Roy, Jean (1788). Nouvelle histoire des cardinaux françois ... par M. l'abbé Roy (in French). Vol. Tome neuvième. Paris: Poinçot. [contains a biography of Cardinal de Talleyrand, 150 pp.]
- Wood, Diana (1989). Clement VI: The Pontificate and Ideas of an Avignon Pope. Cambridge UK: Cambridge University Press. ISBN 978-0-521-89411-1.
- Setton, Kenneth M. (1953). "Archbishop Pierre d'Ameil in Naples and the Affair of Aimon III of Geneva (1363-1364)". Speculum. 28 (4): 643–691. doi:10.2307/2849199. JSTOR 2849199.
- Zacour, Norman P. (1956). Petrarch and Talleyrand, Speculum, Vol. 31, No. 4 (Oct., 1956), pp. 683–703
- Zacour, Norman P. (1960). Talleyrand: The Cardinal of Perigord (1301-1364), Transactions of the American Philosophical Society, new ser., v. 50, pt. 7.
