= Duke of Slavonia =

Title in Dalmatia and Croatia

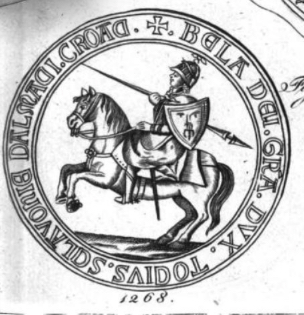
Seal of prince Béla, Duke of Slavonia (1260–1269)

The Duke of Slavonia (Croatian: slavonski herceg; Latin: dux Slavoniae), also meaning the Duke of Dalmatia and Croatia (Croatian: herceg Hrvatske i Dalmacije; Latin: dux Dalmatiae et Croatiae) was a title of nobility granted several times in the 12th and 14th centuries, mainly to relatives of Hungarian monarchs or other noblemen.

The title of duke of "whole of Slavonia" didn't mean Slavonia in the narrow sense, but specifically all Slavic lands of the Kingdom of Hungary, being a synonym for the Kingdom of Croatia and Dalmatia (and Slavonian domain). An example being 1231 charter by Coloman in which protected "omnes templarios, qui infra ducatum Sclavonie sunt, tam in Dalmatia, quam in Croatia" ("all the Templars who are within the Duchy of Sclavonia, both in Dalmatia and in Croatia"). The title of duke signified a more extensive power than that of the Ban of Slavonia or Ban of Croatia. In cca. 1185 during Hungarian king Béla III, the "dux Sclauonie" paid to the king each year ten thousand silver coins.

== List of Dukes ==
- Álmos (1084–1095)
- Stephen III (1147–1162)
- Béla III (1162–1172) - "dux tocius Sclauonie" and "gubernator Dalmatiae et Croatiae"
- Emeric (1194–1196)
- Andrew II (1198–1204)
- Béla IV (1220–1226)
- Coloman (1226–1241) - "dux totius Sclavonie" and "dux Dalmatie atque Croatie"
- Denis Türje (1241–1245)
- Stephen V (1245–1257)
- Béla (1260–1269)
- Ladislaus IV (1270–1272)
- Andrew (1274–1278)
- Andrew III (1278–1290, in rebellion)
- Stefan Vladislav II (fl. 1292–1293), under titular King of Hungary and Croatia Charles Martel of Anjou
- Tomasina Morosini (fl. 1295–1296/97), under her son Andrew III of Hungary
- Albertino Morosini (1297–1301/05)
- Stephen (1353–1354)
- Charles of Durazzo (1371–1376)
- Ladislaus of Durazzo / Naples (1386 - 1409)
- John (with his mother Margaret) (1354–1356)
- John Corvinus (1490–1494)

== See also ==
- Frizatik - silver currency minted by Slavonian dukes
- Coat of arms of Dalmatia - initially used by the dukes
- Ban of Slavonia
- Ban of Croatia
- List of rulers of Croatia

== Sources ==
- Barabás, Gábor (2016). "Coloman of Galicia and his Polish Relations: The Duke of Slavonia as Protector of Widowed Duchesses" (PDF). Hungaro–Polonica: Young Scholars on Medieval Polish–Hungarian Relations. Pécs: Történészcéh Egyesület. pp. 89–117.
- Barabás, Gábor (2020). "A King in Slavonia: Prince Coloman in the Realm of St. Stephen in the 1230s". Stefan the First-Crowned and His Time. Belgrade: Institute of History. pp. 291–308.
- Engel, Pál (2001). The Realm of St Stephen: A History of Medieval Hungary, 895–1526. London & New York: I.B.Tauris.
- Font, Márta; Barabás, Gábor (2019). Coloman, King of Galicia and Duke of Slavonia (1208–1241): Medieval Central Europe and Hungarian Power. Leeds: Arc Humanities Press.
- Makk, Ferenc (1994). "Hercegség [Duchy]". Korai magyar történeti lexikon (9-14. század) [Encyclopedia of the Early Hungarian History (9th-14th centuries)] (in Hungarian). Akadémiai Kiadó. p. 261. ISBN 963-05-6722-9.
- Tomašić, Nikola (2010). Pacta Conventa. Feniks knjiga. ISBN 978-953-7710-02-6.
