= Robert of Durazzo =

Italian noble

Robert of Durazzo (1326 – 19 September 1356, Poitiers) was the third son of John, Duke of Durazzo and Agnes de Périgord.

He was the lord of Cappacio, Muro, and Montalbano in the Kingdom of Naples. Captured in 1350 at the siege of Aversa, he was held prisoner by Louis I of Hungary until 1352. After his release, he took refuge with his uncle the Cardinal de Périgord in Avignon, which had just been sold to the Papacy by Joan I of Naples.

His uncle attempted to arrange a marriage for him with the niece of Giovanni Visconti, lord of Milan, but on his journey to Milan, Robert was arrested by James of Piedmont. James' wife, Sibylle des Baux, was convinced that Robert and his Durazzeschi kin had arranged the recent murder of her nephew Robert, Count of Avellino. (Robert had married, by force, Maria of Calabria; but falling into the hands of Louis of Taranto, was murdered by his wife's orders in the Castel dell'Ovo.) Robert was not released until 18 March 1355, through the efforts of his uncle and Pope Innocent VI, and was made to swear to take no revenge on his captors. He immediately broke the promise by seizing the fortress of Les Baux on 6 April 1355. This was the Provençal seat of Raymond des Baux, brother and successor of the murdered Robert. The Pope was outraged; Robert was defended by his uncle in the papal curia, but did not escape excommunication. After an unsuccessful attempt at mediation by Walter VI of Brienne and others, local levies besieged the castle, and by July, Robert was compelled to surrender it to its rightful owner.

He accompanied the Cardinal to the Battle of Poitiers. Before the battle, the Cardinal attempted to mediate between the English forces under Edward, the Black Prince and the French forces under John II of France. Robert, like many of the Cardinal's men, joined the fight on the French side, and was killed there. This violation of the neutrality which ought to adhere to a churchman and mediator so provoked Edward the Black Prince that he had Robert's body borne on a shield to the Cardinal as a mocking salute.
