= Stephen of Anjou =

Stephen
- Duke of Transylvania, Croatia, Dalmatia and Slavonia
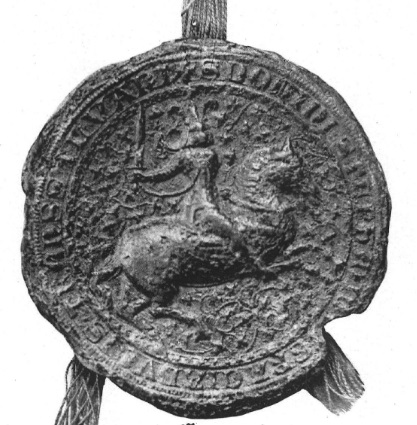
- Seal of Stephen of Anjou, 1351
- Born: 20 August 1332
- Died: 9 August 1354 (aged 21)
- Burial: Zagreb Cathedral (?)
- Spouse: Margaret of Bavaria
- Issue: John, Duke of Slavonia; Elizabeth, Princess of Taranto
- House: Capetian House of Anjou
- Father: Charles I of Hungary
- Mother: Elizabeth of Poland

Stephen (Hungarian: István; 20 August 1332 – 9 August 1354) was a Hungarian royal prince of the Capetian House of Anjou. He was the youngest son of Charles I of Hungary and Elizabeth of Poland to survive childhood. He was styled as duke of Slavonia from 1339 to 1346, but he had no role in the government of the province. Stephen's separate household was set up in 1349. In this year, he received the counties of Szepes and Sáros from his brother, Louis I of Hungary. Louis made him duke of Transylvania in late 1349, but soon appointed him to administer Slavonia.

Stephen was regarded as his childless brother's heir. He and his mother governed the kingdom during Louis's first campaign of Naples in 1350. Late in the same year, Stephen was again made duke of Transylvania, but from 1352 to 1353 he was styled duke of Szepes and Sáros. Thereafter, he was entrusted with the administration of Croatia, Dalmatia and Slavonia. He died on his return from a campaign against Serbia. His infant son, John, inherited his duchy.

== Youth ==
Stephen was the youngest of five sons born to Charles I of Hungary and his third wife, Elizabeth of Poland. Of the five, Louis, Andrew and Stephen survived infancy. Stephen was born on "the feast of St Stephen" (that is on 20 August) in 1332, according to the Illuminated Chronicle. He was named for the first king of Hungary, Stephen, who had been canonized in 1083. He was baptized by Archbishop Csanád Telegdi. A priest of Bohemian origin, Ladislaus, was one of his tutors.

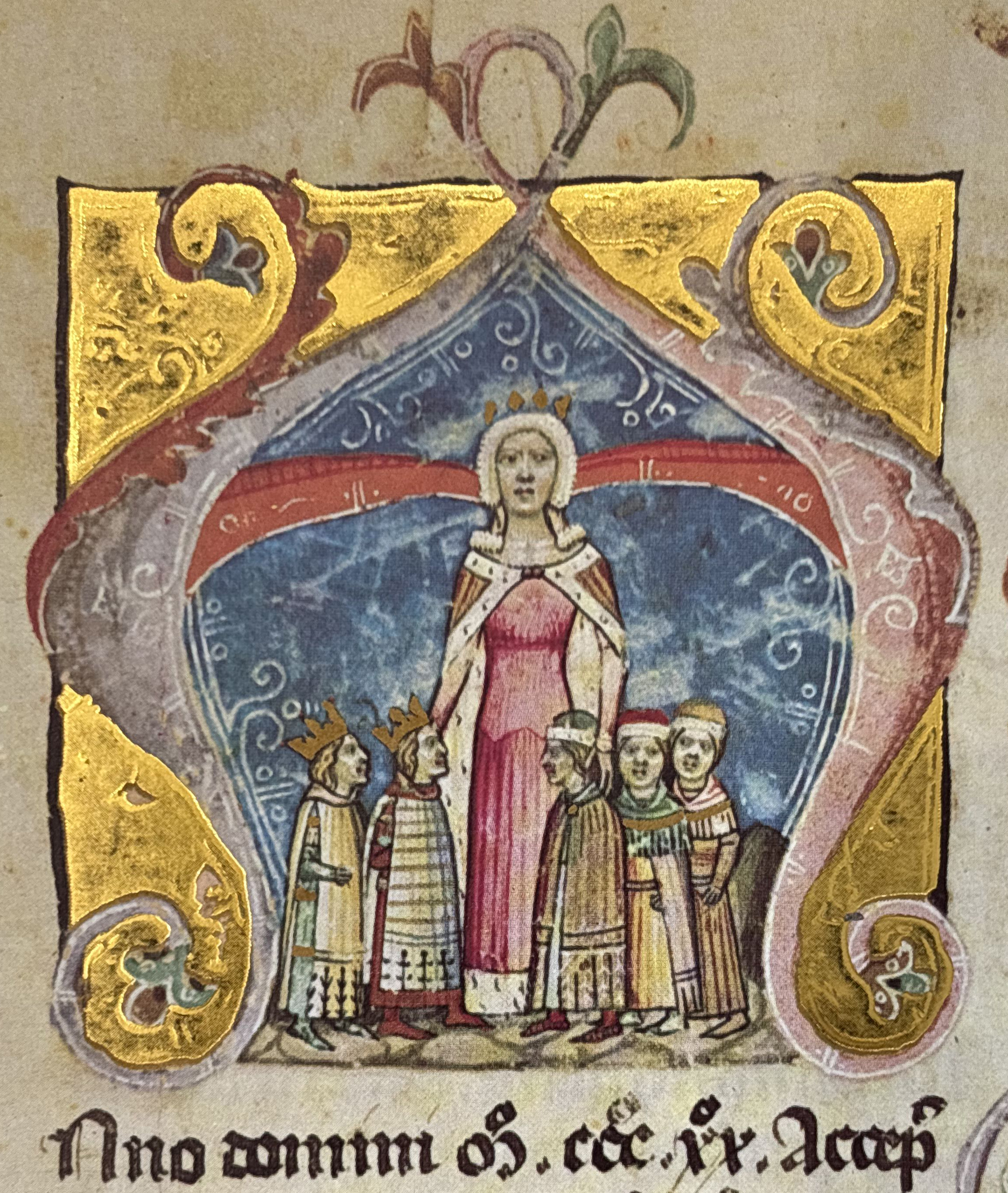
The child Stephen, standing on his mother's left side, along with his brothers and sisters, as depicted in the Illuminated Chronicle

Stephen was first mentioned in a royal charter of his father on 12 May 1339. In the document, he was styled as Duke of Slavonia, but he did not assume direct government of the province: the bans (or governors) continued to govern Slavonia on the king's behalf. In July, Stephen's maternal uncle, Casimir III of Poland, named Stephen's mother and father or one of their sons as his heir if he died without a legitimate heir. Decades later, the Polish historian, Jan of Czarnków, claimed that Charles had decided to secure a throne for each of his sons and wanted to make Stephen his heir in Hungary. Next year, a Venetian envoy recorded that Charles was planning to visit Dalmatia along with his wife and "their younger son" who must have been Stephen.

Charles I died on 16 July 1342. During the first years of the reign of his brother, Louis, Stephen was only sporadically mentioned in official documents. At Stephen's request, the judge royal, Paul Nagymartoni, deferred a hearing in 1343 and exempted a nobleman of paying a fine in 1344. Stephen was regularly mentioned in his brother's charters of grant from May 1345, evidencing that he had become a member of the royal council.

Stephen's brother, Andrew, who had married Joanna I of Naples, was murdered on 18 September 1345. Louis I of Hungary accused Joanna of staging the plot against Andrew. Louis entered into correspondence with Pope Clement VI, demanding her punishment. From early 1346, Louis also urged the pope to grant the Kingdom of Naples to him or to Stephen. The pope styled Stephen as duke or duke of Transylvania in his letters addressed to Louis, but the Hungarian documents consequently referred to him as the "duke of all Slavonia" in 1345 and 1346. Louis conquered significant territories during his first campaign in southern Italy in 1347 and 1348, but after he returned to Hungary, Joanna and her second husband, Louis of Taranto, expelled Louis' troops from most fortresses.

== Duke ==
Stephen was given a household of his own and he also received the counties of Szepes and Sáros in the summer of 1349. The first reference to a member of Stephen's household was recorded on 11 June. Historian Éva B. Halász says, the establishment of Stephen's own household was most probably connected to his brother's negotiations with the papal legate, Guy of Boulogne. Louis I proposed that Stephen should marry Joanna I's sister and heir, Maria, and the pope should grant Naples to Stephen.

Stephen styled himself as "lord of Szepes and Sáros" in his two charters in 1349. In his second charter, issued in November, he also bore the title of "duke of Transylvania". B. Halász proposes that Louis I made his brother duke of the province because of the short rebellion of Andrew Szécsi, Bishop of Transylvania, but Stephen's tenure was short because he was appointed to administer Slavonia. One of his retainers, Thomas Gönyűi, was first mentioned as the ispán (or head) of a Slavonian county already on 8 December 1349 and the ban of Slavonia did not witness Louis I's charters from the same month until October 1350, showing that Stephen received the realm in late 1349.

Stephen had already been regarded the childless Louis's heir. Before departing for his second Neapolitan campaign in 1350, Louis I appointed Stephen and their mother his lieutenants. Stephen was again made duke of Transylvania in November or October 1350, after Louis's return from Naples. He visited Transylvania and issued a charter in Felvinc (now Unirea in Romania) in January 1351. He styled himself duke of Transylvania for the last time on 18 October 1351.

Stephen again governed Szepes and Sáros, bearing the title of duke, from late 1351 to early 1353. Thereafter, Louis I appointed him to administer Croatia, Dalmatia and Slavonia, most probably because the relationship of Hungary and the neighboring powers, Venice and Serbia, had become tense. His relationship with his tutor had worsened for unknown reason and Ladislaus described Stephen as a new Nero in a letter addressed to the pope. Stephen accompanied Louis against Serbia in the summer of 1354. Stephen died for unknown reasons during his return from the campaign on 9 August 1354. He was buried in the Zagreb Cathedral, according to local tradition, first recorded in 1760.

== Family ==
Ancestors of Stephen of Anjou

16. Charles I of Naples
8. Charles II of Naples
17. Beatrice of Provence
4. Charles Martel of Anjou
18. Stephen V of Hungary
9. Mary of Hungary
19. Elizabeth the Cuman
2. Charles I of Hungary
20. Albert IV of Habsburg
10. Rudolf I of Germany
21. Heilwig of Kiburg
5. Klementia of Habsburg
11. Gertrude of Hohenberg
1. Stephen of Anjou
24. Konrad I of Masovia
12. Casimir I of Kuyavia
25. Agafia of Rus
6. Władysław I of Poland
26. Casimir I of Opole
13. Euphrosyne of Opole
27. Viola of (?) Bulgaria
3. Elisabeth of Poland
28. Władysław Odonic of Greater Poland
14. Bolesław the Pious
29. Jadwiga
7. Jadwiga of Kalisz
30. Béla IV of Hungary
15. Yolanda of Hungary
31. Maria Laskarina

Plans about the marriage of Stephen and Margaret of Bavaria were first mentioned in 1345. She was the daughter of the Holy Roman Emperor, Louis IV, who had been excommunicated by the Holy See. Stephen married Margaret only after her father's death, in late 1350, because Pope Clement VI had sharply opposed the marriage. His marriage with a German princess made him unpopular in Poland. The Polish noblemen acknowledged Louis as Casimir III's sole heir in July 1351 only after he had promised that he would not allow Stephen to participate in the government of Poland.

Margaret gave birth to a daughter and a son. Stephen and Margaret's daughter, Elizabeth, was born around 1353. She was given in marriage to Philip of Taranto, the titular Emperor of Constantinople, in 1370. Stephen's son, John, inherited Croatia, Dalmatia and Slavonia from his father, but he was still a child when he died in 1360.

== See also ==
- Stephen's Tower (Budapest)

== Sources ==
=== Primary sources ===
- The Hungarian Illuminated Chronicle: Chronica de Gestis Hungarorum (Edited by Dezső Dercsényi) (1970). Corvina, Taplinger Publishing. ISBN 0-8008-4015-1.

=== Secondary sources ===
- B. Halász, Éva (2016). "Anjou István herceg (1332–1354)". In Zsoldos, Attila (ed.). Hercegek és hercegségek a középkori Magyarországon [Dukes and Dukedoms in Medieval Hungary] (in Hungarian). Városi Levéltár és Kutatóintézet. pp. 81–93. ISBN 978-963-8406-13-2.
- Csukovits, Enikő (1994). "Stephen 7.". In Kristó, Gyula; Engel, Pál; Makk, Ferenc (eds.). Korai magyar történeti lexikon (9–14. század) [Encyclopedia of the Early Hungarian History (9th–14th centuries)] (in Hungarian). Akadémiai Kiadó. p. 294. ISBN 963-05-6722-9.
- Dümmerth, Dezső (1982). Az Anjou-ház nyomában [On the House of Anjou] (in Hungarian). Panoráma. ISBN 963-243-179-0.
- Engel, Pál (2001). The Realm of St Stephen: A History of Medieval Hungary, 895–1526. I.B. Tauris Publishers. ISBN 1-86064-061-3.
- Franzl, Johan (2002). I. Rudolf: Az első Habsburg a német trónon [Rudolph I: The First Habsburg on the German Throne] (in Hungarian). Corvina. ISBN 963-13-5138-6.
- Halecki, Oskar (1991). Jadwiga of Anjou and the Rise of East Central Europe. Polish Institute of Arts and Sciences of America. ISBN 0-88033-206-9.
- Knoll, Paul W. (1972). The Rise of the Polish Monarchy: Piast Poland in East Central Europe, 1320–1370. The University of Chicago Press. ISBN 0-226-44826-6.

Stephen of Hungary House of Anjou Cadet branch of the House of Capet Born: 1332 Died: 1354
Royal titles
Vacant Title last held by Louis	Duke of Transylvania; 1350–1351	Last creation
Vacant Title last held by Andrew	Duke of Slavonia; 1351–1354	Succeeded by John
