= Counts and dukes of Gravina =

Rulers of Gravina, Puglia, Italy

The counts of Gravina, later the dukes of Gravina, were medieval rulers of Gravina in Puglia, in the old Kingdom of Sicily and the Kingdom of Naples. The county was settled on various royal favorites, and was held by members of the Neapolitan royal family from about 1300 until 1385. In 1417, it was granted to Francesco Orsini, who was created a duke in 1436; his descendant holds the title today, and represents the remaining branch of the Orsini family. Among the Orsini dukes, Pietro Francesco resigned his temporal dignities in 1667 to become a Dominican, and subsequently ascended the papal throne as Pope Benedict XIII. His nephew, Duke Domenico II, was created cardinal. Francesco (d. 1503) also achieved notoriety by being strangled in Senigallia while a captive of Cesare Borgia.

== Counts of Gravina ==
- Robert, in 1132
- Alexander, mid-12th century
- Gilbert, 1159–1167
- Richard de Say, from 1168
- William de Say, ca. 1210
- Riccardo Orsini (d. 1304), 1284–1291, also Count palatine of Cephalonia and Zakynthos, Capt. Gen. of Corfu 1286–1289, Bailli of Morea 1297–1300
- Peter Tempesta (1292–1315), Count of Gravina ?–1315
- John, Duke of Durazzo (1294–1336), Count of Gravina 1315
- Charles, Duke of Durazzo
- Louis of Durazzo (1324–1362)
- Charles III of Naples (1345–1386), Count of Gravina 1362–1385
- Spinetta II Malaspina (d. 1398), Count of Gravina from April 8, 1385
- Francesco Orsini (d. 1456), Count of Gravina from 1417, created Duke of Gravina in 1436

== Dukes of Gravina ==
- Francesco Orsini (d. 1456), created Duke in 1436
- Giacomo Orsini (d. 1472)
- Raimondo Orsini (d. c. 1488)
- Francesco Orsini (d. 1503)
- Ferdinando I Orsini (d. 1549)
- Antonio Orsini (d. 1553)
- Ferdinando II Orsini (1538–1583)
- Michele Antonio I Orsini (d. 1627)
- Felicia Maria Orsini (d. 1647), resigned the Duchy to her cousin in 1635
- Pietro Francesco Orsini (d. bef. 1641)
- Ferdinando II Orsini (1623–1658)
- Pietro Francesco Orsini (1649–1730), resigned the Duchy in 1667
- Domenico I Orsini (1652–1705)
- Ferdinando Bernualdo Filippo Orsini (1685–1734)
- Domenico II Orsini (1719–1789)
- Filippo Bernualdo Orsini (1742–1824)
- Domenico III Orsini (1790–1874)
- Filippo I Orsini (1842–1924)
- Domenico Napoleone I Orsini (1868–1947)
- Virginio Orsini (1892–1972)
- Filippo II Orsini (1920–1984)
- Domenico Napoleone II Orsini (b. 1948)

Don Federico Carlos (1756–1806), a Spanish grandee and son of the Duke of San Miguel, also used the title of Duke of Gravina.

== See also ==
- Orsini family
