= Agnes of Périgord =

Duchess consort of Durazzo

- Duchess of Durazzo
- Coat of arms of the House of Talleyrand-Périgord

Duchess of Durazzo
- Tenure: 1332–1336
- Predecessor: Catherine of Valois–Courtenay (as Queen consort of Albania)
- Successor: Maria of Calabria
- Died: 1345
- Burial: Convent of Santa Chiara, Naples
- Spouse: John, Duke of Durazzo
- Issue: Charles, Duke of Durazzo; Louis of Durazzo; Robert of Durazzo
- House: House of Talleyrand-Périgord
- Father: Helie VII, Count of Périgord
- Mother: Brunissende of Foix

Agnes of Périgord (died 1345) was Duchess consort of Durazzo, through her marriage to John of Gravina, Duke of Durazzo, who was also the ruler of the Kingdom of Albania. Although Agnes was never styled as Queen consort, she became politically influential. Following the death of Robert, King of Naples in 1343, she organised a marriage for her eldest son to Robert's granddaughter, who was second-in-line to the Neapolitan throne. Agnes's ambition was to bring her family closer to the line of succession.

== Early life and marriage ==
Agnes was daughter of Helie VII, Count of Périgord and his second wife, Brunissende of Foix. Amongst her siblings was Hélie de Talleyrand-Périgord, a Cardinal who would become a major figure in the Avignon Papacy.

The marriage between Agnes and John was likely arranged by King Robert of Sicily due to his favour for the Avignon Papacy. The King had anti-Ghibelline ambitions in Northern Italy and desired support from the Papacy and the French in achieving them. Agnes's family had marital ties to Pope John XXII as her sister Rosemburge was married to Jacques de Lavie, the Pope's grand-nephew. Acting upon this during his visit to Avignon, Robert arranged for his brother to marry Jacques's sister-in-law.

The marriage contract is dated 14 November 1321. The couple were married shy of fourteen years and had three sons:

- Charles, Duke of Durazzo (1323–1348)
- Louis of Durazzo (1324–1362), Count of Gravina
- Robert of Durazzo (1326–1356)

Agnes became, through her husband's brotherly quarrel with Philip I, Prince of Taranto, duchess of Durazzo. Her husband died in 1335 and he was succeeded by their son, Charles.

== Political intrigues ==
Any plans that the Durazzo family may have had of marrying Joanna, heiress to Robert's throne, were thwarted in 1333 when Robert arranged for her to marry Andrew of Hungary. However, in his final will and testament, Robert instructed that if Joanna were to die without issue, the Neapolitan throne should pass to her sister, Maria, who was unmarried. Whilst the monarch was spoken for, the heir was not. Agnes did her best to make her family appear favourable towards the royals, in the hope that Robert would consider a Durazzo match for Maria. In 1338, she supported her son's position at the head of Robert's armada to conquer Sicily. However, the campaign failed due to the outbreak of typhus. Agnes used her own position at court to her advantage, making friendly overtures towards Queen Sancha and the young princesses. This too did not result in any marriage plans.

King Robert died in January 1343. Agnes's tactics during his final years had proven unsuccessful therefore, she took matters into her own hands. Immediately after Robert's death, she orchestrated the marriage between her eldest son and Maria. The timing of this marriage was crucial as Joanna strongly favoured the Taranto faction, having an affair with Prince Robert, son of Catherine, and Maria was promised in marriage to one of Andrew's brothers. The two matters would only have politically isolated the Durazzo clan and thwarted their chances of reaching the throne.

Agnes used her connection to her influential brother, Cardinal Talleyrand, to put aside the Hungarian match for Maria and obtain the Pope's permission for the ambitious marriage. Not relying on family feeling alone, Agnes bribed her brother with 22,000 florins left over from her dowry in order to ensure absolute support. Building up a friendship with Queen Sancha also appears to have paid off as the dowager queen supported the match. On the other hand, the Taranto clan were horrified when they discovered Agnes's scheme and used their influence over Joanna to put an end to it. Catherine instructed the young queen to oppose the match, hoping that the lack of royal favour would act as a deterrent.

Much to the dismay of the Tarantos, their control over Joanna was not enough to prevent Agnes, who responded by abducting Maria one night in April 1343 and marrying her off to Charles. The marriage was a great insult to Joanna and Andrew as their royal authority was defied and the latter's family lost out on their chance for total control of the succession. The Tarantos were ready for armed warfare against their Durazzo cousins, Naples stood on the brink of civil war. To remedy the matter, the Pope wrote letters to both Joanna and Agnes, confirming the validity of the papal dispensation, asking them to put aside their differences and to urge Joanna to allow an official marriage ceremony. The letter to Agnes also informs that the Pope was sending Talleyrand's chamberlain, Roger of Vintrono, who had experience in the Papal service in Italy, to mend the breach amongst the Neapolitans. Roger's efforts clearly worked as Andrew pardoned Agnes and her family and the marriage was officially recognised on 14 July. The fact that Maria was pregnant probably also helped resolve the issue, no more scandals were desired.

Agnes then became involved in the marital disputes between Joanna and Andrew. As the latter was initially refused joint authority with his wife, he wrote to his mother Elisabeth, announcing plans to flee Naples. Elisabeth decided to make a state visit and threatened to take Andrew with her when she returned home. For the first time, Agnes, Catherine and Joanna worked together to persuade Elisabeth not to do so. All three women were aware that Andrew would only return with a Hungarian army; according to Domenico de Gravina, Joanna and Catherine were motivated purely by this threat however, Agnes was genuinely concerned with the welfare of Andrew. The appeals worked and Andrew remained. Despite her assistance in this matter, Joanna did not forgive Agnes for her marital scheming.

== Death ==
Much like her life, Agnes's death was also surrounded by political intrigue. During the early months of 1345, the duchess had managed to make herself even more unpopular with Joanna by meddling in diplomacy linked to the Papacy. In addition, she had attempted to have one of her sons married to Catherine's daughter, in the hope of penetrating the Taranto clan. In May, she fell ill. Allegedly, the doctor asked for a urine sample and when this was taken that evening, it was switched with that of a pregnant lady-in-waiting, who was a friend of Joanna's. When the doctor discovered that Agnes was supposedly pregnant, it caused a scandal and led to her son, Charles, keeping his distance from her. This made for perfect conditions for the ladies-in-waiting to poison Agnes.

Although, it is quite possible that these events are fictional, they are accounted by Domenico de Gravina, whom as noted from the encounter with Elisabeth, appeared sympathetic to Agnes rather than Joanna and Catherine. It is just as possible that Agnes succumbed to a bacterial infection, worsened by the hot climate.

Charles and Maria never ascended the throne, the former was executed three years after the death of his mother for his own political intrigues involving Joanna and the Hungarians. Despite this, Charles, a grandson of Agnes through her son, Louis, succeeded to the throne in 1382. Much like his family, he clashed with Joanna but he managed to depose her and had her strangled. He was married to Margaret, a daughter of Charles and Maria.

== Ancestry ==
Ancestry of Agnes Périgord

16. Archambaud II, Count of Périgord
8. Helie VI, Count of Périgord
17. Brunichilde of Foix
4. Archambaud III, Count of Périgord
9. Gaillard
2. Helie VII, Count of Périgord
20. Adhemar V of Limoges
10. Guy V of Limoges
21. Sarah De Cornouailles
5. Marguerite of Limoges
11. Ermengarde de Barry
1. Agnes of Périgord
24. Roger-Bernard II, Count of Foix
12. Roger IV, Count of Foix
25. Ermesinde, Viscountess of Castellbò
6. Roger-Bernard III, Count of Foix
26. Ramon VIII, Viscount of Cardona
13. Brunissenda of Cardona
27. Agnes of Tarroja
3. Brunissende of Foix
28. Guillem II de Montcada
14. Gaston VII, Viscount of Béarn
29. Garsenda of Provence
7. Margaret, Viscountess of Béarn
30. Boson of Marsan
15. Martha, Viscountess of Marsan
31. Petronilla, Countess of Bigorre

== Bibliography ==
- Edwin Lawrence Godkin, The History of Hungary and the Magyars: From the Earliest Period to the Close of the Late War (Cassell, 1853)
- Nancy Goldstone, Joanna, The Notorious Queen of Naples, Jerusalem and Sicily (Weidenfeld & Nicolson, 2010)
- Ronald G. Musto, Medieval Naples: A Documentary History, 400-1400 (New York, NY: Italica Press, 2012)
- Zacour, Norman P. (1960). "Talleyrand: The Cardinal of Périgord (1301-1364)" (PDF). Transactions of the American Philosophical Society. 50 (7). American Philosophical Society.
