= John of Gravina =

John
- Duke of Durazzo; Prince of Achaea; Count of Gravina
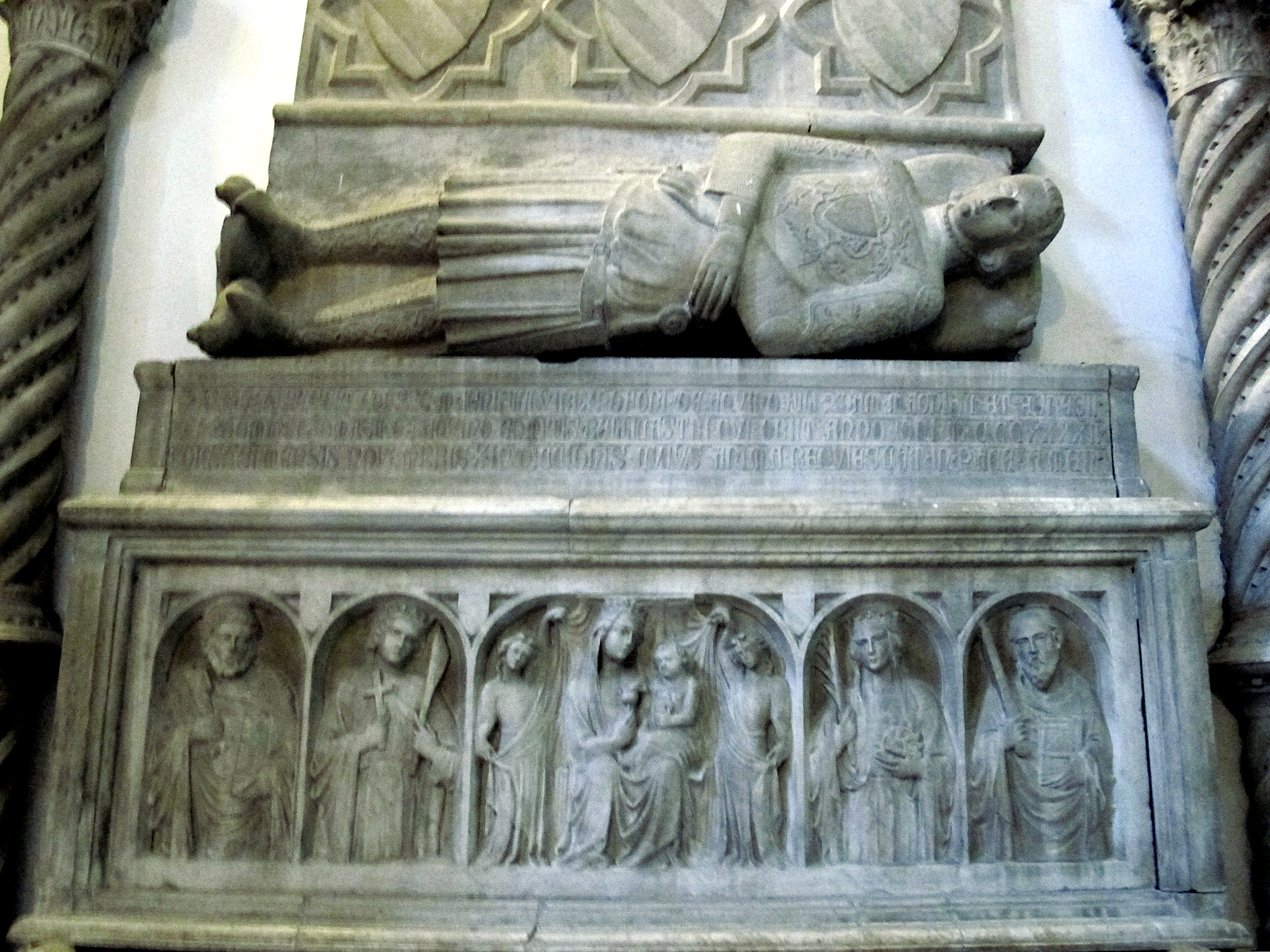
- Tomb of John, Duke of Durazzo

Duke of Durazzo
- Reign: 1332–1336
- Predecessor: Robert, Prince of Taranto (as King of Albania)
- Successor: Charles, Duke of Durazzo
- Born: 1294
- Died: 5 April 1336 (aged 41–42)
- Spouse: Matilda of Hainaut; Agnes of Périgord
- Issue: Charles, Duke of Durazzo; Louis of Durazzo; Robert of Durazzo
- House: House of Anjou-Sicily; House of Anjou-Durazzo (founder)
- Father: Charles II of Naples
- Mother: Mary of Hungary

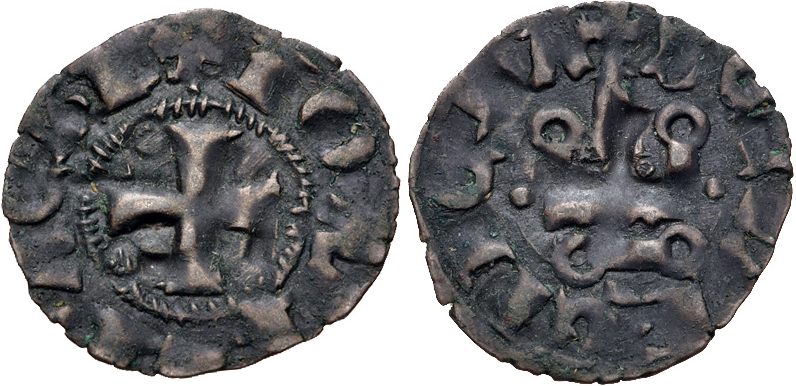
Denier of John as Prince of Achaea.

John (1294 – 5 April 1336), a member of the Capetian House of Anjou, was Count of Gravina 1315–1336, Prince of Achaea 1318–1332, Duke of Durazzo 1332–1336 and ruler of the Kingdom of Albania (although he never used a royal title). He was the youngest son of King Charles II of Naples and Mary of Hungary.

He was a younger brother of (among others) Charles Martel of Anjou, Saint Louis of Toulouse, Robert of Naples and Philip I of Taranto.

On 3 September 1313 he was named Captain-General of Calabria. In 1315, he succeeded his brother Peter, Count of Gravina after the latter was killed at the Battle of Montecatini.

The death of Louis of Burgundy in 1316 widowed Matilda of Hainaut, Princess of Achaea. Her suzerain, John's brother Philip I of Taranto, had her brought by force to Naples in 1318 to marry John, a design intended to bring the Principality of Achaea into the Angevin inheritance. The marriage, celebrated in March 1318, failed of its objective: Matilda refused to surrender her rights to Achaea to her husband and ultimately contracted a secret marriage with Hugh de La Palice. This violated the marriage contract of her mother Isabelle, which had pledged that Isabelle and all her female heirs should not marry without permission of their suzerain. On these grounds, Philip stripped her of Achaea and bestowed it upon John: the marriage was annulled for non-consummation, and Matilda was imprisoned in the Castel dell'Ovo.

On 14 November 1321, John took a second wife, Agnes of Périgord, daughter of Helie VII, Count of Périgord and Brunissende de Foix. They had four sons:

- Charles, Duke of Durazzo (1323–1348). Married Maria of Calabria
- Louis of Durazzo (1324–1362), Count of Gravina
- Robert of Durazzo (1326–1356)

In a tardy reaction to the Byzantine advances in the central Morea, in 1325 John launched a military expedition, financed by the Acciaiuoli, to Achaea. While he re-established his authority in Cefaphonia and Zante, he was unable to recapture Skorta from the control of the Byzantine Empire.

In 1332, Philip of Taranto died and was succeeded by his son Robert of Taranto, who became the new suzerain of Achaea. Not wishing to swear fealty to his nephew, John arranged to surrender Achaea to him in exchange for Robert's rights to the Kingdom of Albania and a loan of 5,000 ounces of gold raised upon Niccolo Acciaiuoli, and thenceforth adopted the style of "Duke of Durazzo".

== Sources ==
- Kelly, Samantha (2003). The New Solomon: Robert of Naples (1309-1343) and Fourteenth-Century Kingship. Brill.
- Percy, William A. (1995). "Houses of Anjou". In Kibler, William W.; Zinn, Grover A. (eds.). Medieval France:An Encyclopedia. Garland Publishing.
- Zacour, Norman P. (1960). "Talleyrand: The Cardinal of Périgord (1301-1364)". Transactions of the American Philosophical Society. New Series. 50 (7): 1–83. doi:10.2307/1005798. JSTOR 1005798.

Preceded by Peter	Count of Gravina; 1315–1336	Succeeded by Charles
Preceded by Robert as lord of Albania	Duke of Durazzo; 1332–1336	Succeeded by Charles
Preceded by Matilda	Prince of Achaea; 1322–1332	Succeeded by Robert
Preceded by John II Orsini	Count Palatine of Cephalonia and Zakynthos; 1322–1332	Succeeded by Robert
