= Margaret of Bavaria, Duchess of Slavonia =

Margaret of Bavaria

Duchess Consort of Transylvania, Croatia, Dalmatia and Slavonia
- Reign: 1350 - 9 August 1354
- Born: 1325
- Died: 1374 (aged 48–49)
- Spouse: Stephen of Anjou; Gerlach von Hohenlohe
- Issue: Elizabeth of Slavonia; John of Anjou
- House: Wittelsbach
- Father: Louis IV, Holy Roman Emperor
- Mother: Margaret II, Countess of Hainaut

Margaret of Bavaria (1325–1374) was the eldest child of Louis IV, Holy Roman Emperor, and Margaret II, Countess of Hainaut. She was Duchess of Slavonia, Croatia and Dalmatia by marriage, and regent over the same duchies during the minority of her son in 1354-1356.

In Ofen in 1351, Margaret married Stephen, Duke of Slavonia, the youngest son of King Charles I of Hungary and Elizabeth of Poland. The couple's first child, Elizabeth, was born the next year, and was followed by John in 1354. Upon Stephen's death the same year, John inherited the duchy, with Duchess Margaret as his guardian.

The Duchess remarried in 1356, choosing Gerlach von Hohenlohe (1344-1392) as her second husband, but kept the regency over Slavonia, Croatia and Dalmatia. However, a war broke out between the Kingdom of Hungary and the Republic of Venice in the spring of the same year and the royal court decided to end the duchy's autonomy. Margaret was thus deprived of power. John, who had been recognised as heir presumptive of both Hungary and Poland, died in 1360.

She died in 1374.
