= Albania under the Bulgarian Empire =

Historical period of Albania

The territory of modern Albania was part of the Bulgarian Empire during certain periods in the Middle Ages and some parts in what is now eastern Albania were populated and ruled by the Bulgarians for centuries. Most of Albania became part of the First Empire in the early 840s during the reign of Khan Presian. Some coastal towns such as Durrës remained in the hands of the Byzantines for most of that period. The castles of the inner mountainous country remained one of the last Bulgarian strongholds to be conquered by the Byzantines in 1018/1019 during the fall of the First Bulgarian Empire — Tomornitsa. During the Byzantine rule Albania was one of the centres of a Uprising of Peter Delyan. The last Bulgarian Emperor to govern the whole territory was Ivan Asen II (1218–1241) but after his successors the Bulgarian rule diminished. Much of that area corresponded with the Bulgarian historical region Kutmichevitsa.

== Background ==
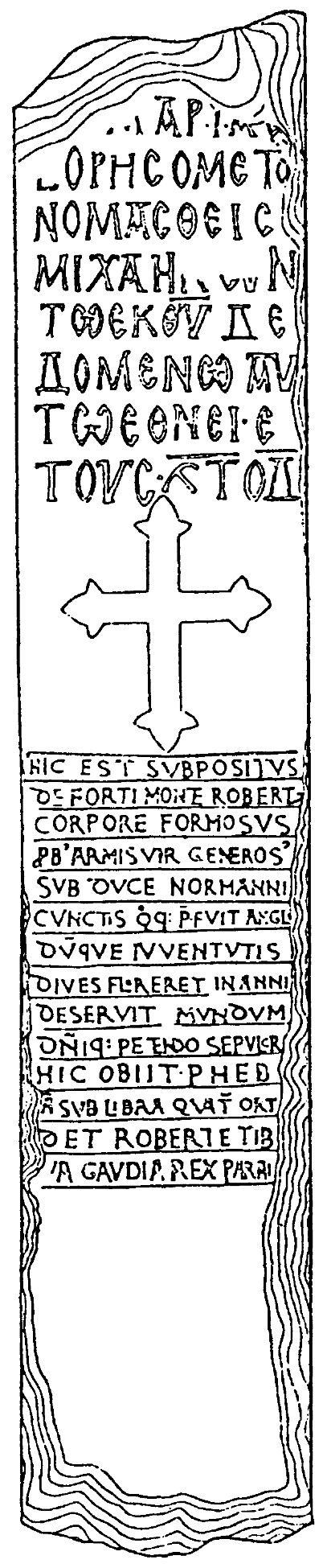
The Ballshi inscription dating from Boris I' rule was found in the village of the same name in 1918.

During the 6th century the territory of the whole Balkan Peninsula including Albania was settled by the Slavs who came from the north. The Eastern Roman Empire was incapable of defending its Balkan possessions and most of the indigenous population found refuge in the large coastal towns while inland they were slowly assimilated by the Slavs. With the arrival of the Bulgars in the region during the 7th century, one Bulgar group led by Kuber settled in Macedonia and eastern Albania.

== First Bulgarian Empire ==
The formation of the Bulgarian state as a coordinated effort of Bulgars and Slavs under Khan Asparukh in 681 determined the political doctrine of the new state — incorporation of the Slavic tribes in the Balkans under the Bulgar rulers. The major successes over the Byzantines during the reign of Krum enabled the Slavic expansion to the south-west. In the 840s most of what is now Albania and Macedonia were annexed by Bulgaria ruled by Presian and his kavkhan (first minister) Isbul. After the Christianization of Bulgaria in the mid 9th century under Presian's son and successor, Boris I, many towns in southern and eastern Albania such as Devol, Belgrad or Glavinitsa became major cultural centres. That area including western Macedonia became the second cultural centre of the Bulgarian Empire under the influence of the Ohrid Literary School. That region was known under the name Kutmichevitsa. Around 896 the new and energetic Bulgarian ruler Simeon I seized more than 30 fortresses around Dyrrhachium, the only major town in Byzantine hands, but could not take the town itself. Dyrrhachium was captured in the second half of the 10th century by Emperor Samuil. In 996 Samuil appointed the noble Byzantine captive Ashot for governor of the town who later escaped to Constantinople. In 1005 the Byzantines managed to recapture Dyrrhachium after its new governor John Chryselios handed it over in exchange for the title of patrician for himself and his sons. In an attempt to recover following the disastrous defeat of the Bulgarian army in the battle of Kleidion (1014), Emperor Ivan Vladislav of Bulgaria launched an attack on Dyrrhachium but was killed in the battle marking the end of the First Empire. Resistance in separate fortresses in Albania continued until 1019 led by one of Samuil's generals Ibatzes. The Arbanasi (Albanian) people were first mentioned as "half believers" in a Bulgarian manuscript dating back to 1000-1018.

== Later rule ==
In 1040 an uprising broke out in the area around Durrës under the leadership of the soldier Tihomir following the discontent of the Bulgarian population by the heavy taxes required by the Byzantine administration. Soon the rebellion encompassed the whole of Albania and the rebels joined forces with Peter Delyan who claimed to have been a successor of Samuil. Following the defeat of the Bulgarians in 1041 the Byzantines restored their control over Albania. In 1072 another uprising broke out under Georgi Voiteh but it was also crushed.

After the restoration of the Bulgarian state, most of eastern Albania was incorporated into the Empire by Kaloyan (1197–1207) but was lost to the Despotate of Epirus after his death. However, in 1230 the Epirote armies were decisively defeated by the Bulgarian Emperor Ivan Asen II and most of its lands joined Bulgaria without resistance including the whole of Albania. In an inscription in the SS. Forty Martyrs Church in the capital Tarnovo was written that he conquered "the whole land of Theodore Komnenos from Adrianople to Durrës". Due to the lack of a successor of age and the internal struggle among the nobility, Bulgaria lost most of Albania without any decisive defeat in 1256 after a humiliating treaty signed from the Bulgarian side by the Russian noble Rostislav Mikhailovich. That treaty cost the life of Emperor Michael Asen II. The decline of Bulgaria continued and the country lost its last fortresses in Albania under Constantine Tikh Asen (1257–1277).

== See also ==
- Albania in the Middle Ages
- Bulgarian occupation of Albania
- Bulgarians in Albania
- Albania under Serbia in the Middle Ages
- Albania under the Hohenstaufen
- Albania under the Byzantine Empire
