= Ohrid Literary School =

Cultural centre in the First Bulgarian Empire

Coordinates: 41°06′45″N 20°47′27″E

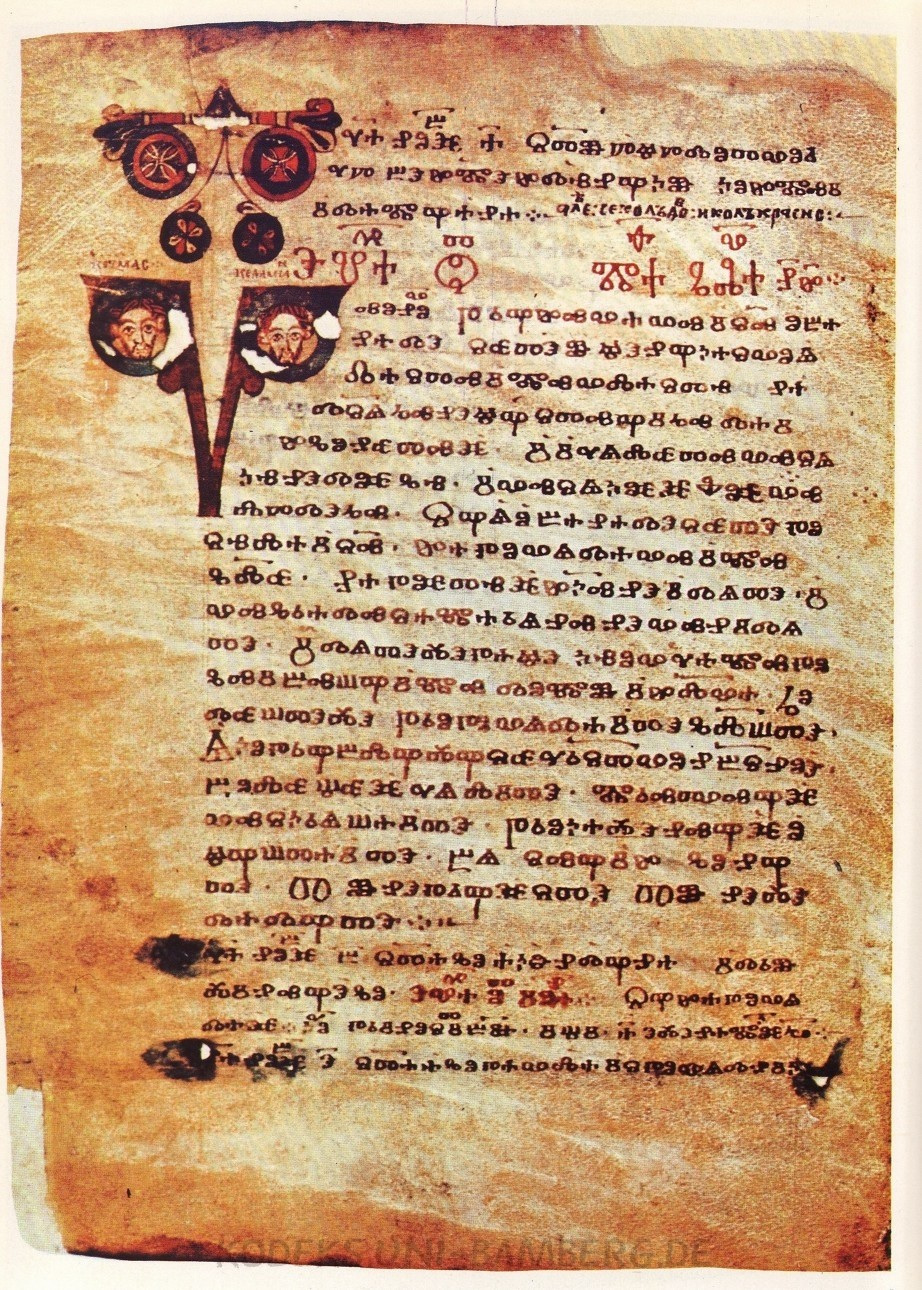
Codex Assemanius, an early example of Old Slavonic text written in Glagolitic script, may have been created in the Ohrid Literary School

The Ohrid Literary School or Ohrid-Devol Literary school was one of the two major cultural centres of the First Bulgarian Empire, along with the Preslav Literary School (Pliska Literary School). The school was established in Ohrid (in what is now North Macedonia). Another center was Devol (modern-day Albania) as well as Drembica, Glavinica and Velika with unknown location. All the school centers were located in a then Bulgarian province known as Kutmichevitsa. It was founded in 886 by Saint Clement of Ohrid on the order of Boris I of Bulgaria simultaneously or shortly after the establishment of the Preslav Literary School. After Clement was ordained bishop of Drembica, Velika (bishopric) in 893, the position of head of the school was assumed by Naum of Preslav. The Ohrid Literary School used the Glagolitic alphabet from its establishment until the 12th century and Cyrillic from the end of the 9th century onward. Between 990 and 1015, Ohrid was the capital of the Bulgarian Empire and simultaneously also the seat of the Bulgarian Patriarchate.

== See also ==
- Golden Age of medieval Bulgarian culture
- Preslav Literary School
- Kutmichevitsa
- Devol (Albania)
- Tarnovo Literary School
