= Albania under the Hohenstaufen =

Medieval historical period

Albania under the Hohenstaufen Hohenstaufen Albania
- 1258–1267
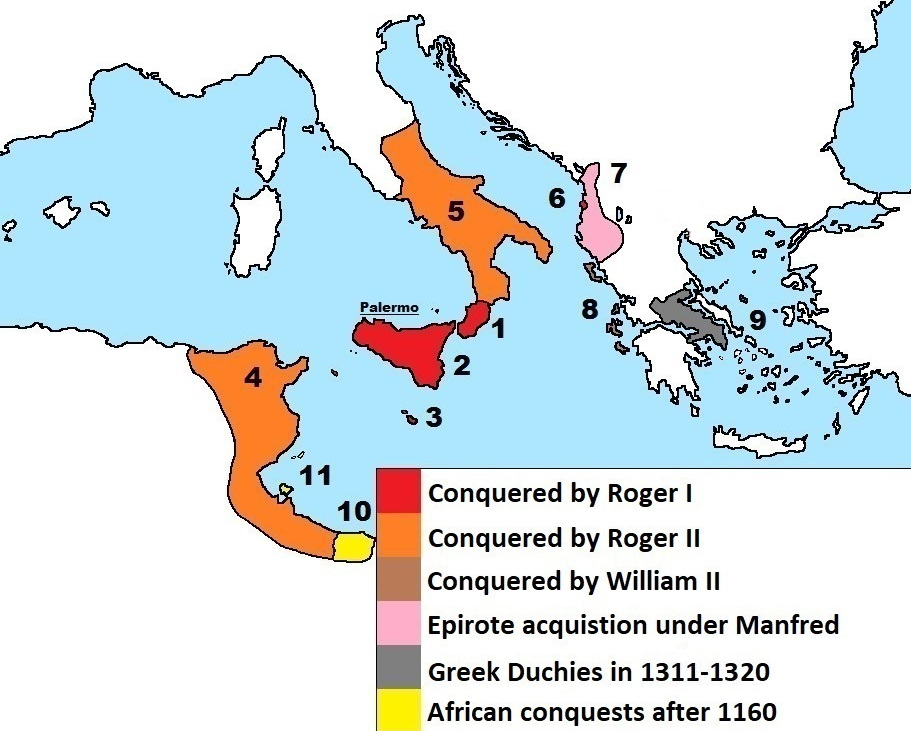
- Map of Albania under Hohenstaufen rule
- Capital: Durrës
- Common languages: Latin, Italian, Albanian, Greek
- Religion: Christianity (Roman Catholicism (state), Eastern Orthodoxy)
- Demonym: Albanian
- Government: Monarchy
  - King: Manfred, King of Sicily
- Commander and Governor
  - 1258–1267: Philip Cinardi
- History
  - Capture of Durrës: 1258
  - War with Nicea: 1259–1261
  - Death of Manfred at Benevento: 1267
Preceded by	Succeeded by
Despotate of Epirus	Kingdom of Albania (medieval)
- Today part of: Albania; Greece

Albania under the Hohenstaufen was a period in the History of Albania that lasted from 1258 until 1267, when Albania came under the rule of the Hohenstaufen of Sicily. Its ruler, Manfred, controlled Albania from his seat in Durazzo (Durrës).

Despite earlier Hohenstaufen Kings of Sicily claiming the lands of Albania, these aspirations would only be achieved by Manfred after his campaign against the Empire of Nicea between 1257–1258, which brought about his capture of Durazzo, Vlorë, Spinarica and Berat. After an alliance with the Despotate of Epirus, his dominions would also include Himarë, Sopot, Butrint and Corfu. Despite the weakening of his state after the Battle of Pelagonia and the Palaiologos campaign on the Albanian coast in 1259, the Hohenstaufen continued their presence in Durazzo and two years later would recapture their lost lands. Hohenstaufen rule lasted until the Battle of Benevento in 1266, after the death of Manfred. This led to both Sicily and the Hohenstaufen dominions in Albania falling to the Angevins.

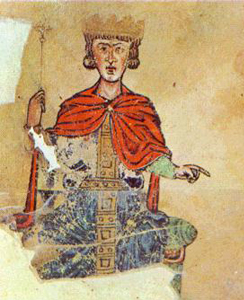
Depiction of Manfred, King of Sicily

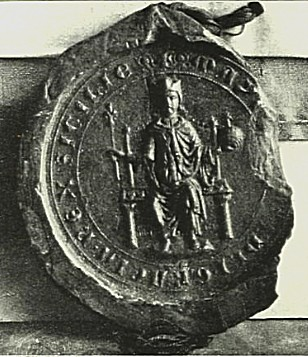
Seal of King Manfred

== History ==
=== Background ===
The Hohenstaufen were a German noble family who rose to rule the Duchy of Swabia in 1079 and the Holy Roman Empire during 1138–1254. After their conflicts with the Welf and their weakening in the German vicinity, the Hohenstaufen would switch their sites towards Sicily, which they would capture with the downfall of the Normans during the late 12th century. Aside from Sicily, another interest for the Hohenstaufen was Albania. Henry VI Hohenstaufen aimed to expand his sphere of influence in the Adriatic Sea. According to historian Niketë Koniati, Henry wished to rule the lands between Durazzo and Thessaloniki. Emperor Frederick II also had ambitions for Albania, but they were never realized.

During the early 13th century, the lands of Albania had been divided between the Despotate of Epirus and the Empire of Nicea. The Nicene had further established their influence in the area after a campaign in Macedonia between 1222–1254.

=== Manfred's Albanian expedition ===
The Hohenstaufen would only achieve their aspirations in Albania under the rule of Manfred. Taking advantage of the revolt of the Despotate of Epirus commanded by Despot Michael II Komnenos Doukas against the Nicene during the winter of 1257, Manfred together with his admiral Philip Cinardi, led an expedition in Albania. Backed up by the Albanian nobility, he landed and captured Durazzo. Afterwards he would capture most of the Albanian coast, including Vlorë and Spinarica. Finally, he would lead a campaign in the Albanian inland, capturing Berat. Despite being in Epirote land, these cities were still under Nicene jurisdiction, however neither side had full administration over them, due to an Albanian revolt earlier that year. Micheal II, viewing Manfred as a worthy opponent offered his daughter Helena's hand in marriage. After accepting, Manfred also received Corfu, Himarë, Butrint and Sopot as dowry.

=== War with the Nicene ===
Besides Albania, Manfred also has ambitions to capture Constantinople. These ambitions were further fuelled by the political captivity of his sister by the Nicene court. This led to him being in direct confrontation with the Empire of Nicea. The Hohenstaufen, together with their allies participated in the Battle of Pelagonia in the spring of 1259, however they would be swiftly defeat by the Empire of Nicea, which had now fallen under the command of the Palaiologos dynasty. Despite only 300 Hohenstaufen soldiers participating in the battle, the defeat still weakened and exposed Manfred. The same year the Nicene mounted a campaign in Albania under Michael VIII Palaiologos, seized all of the Hohenstaufen lands besides Durazzo, which they failed to capture. In 1261, bolstered by reinforcements, Manfred mounted a counterattack and retook his lands, defeating the Nicene.

=== Decline and fall ===
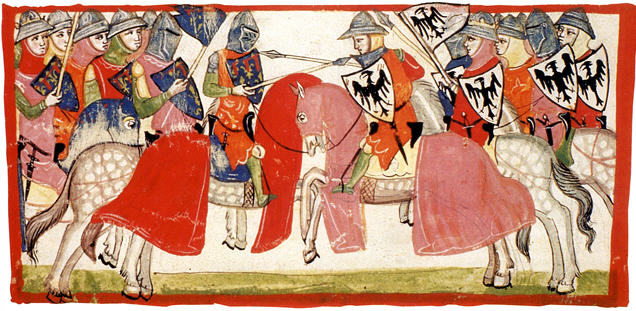
Miniature depicting the Battle of Benevento (1266), with Angevin forces on the left and Hohenstaufen forces on the right

Manfred continued his rule over Albania until 1267. That same year he would be defeated by the Angevins at the Battle of Benevento. He would be killed in the battle alongside most of the Hohenstaufen army. The rest of Sicily would also fall with little to no resistance to his rival, Charles I of Anjou. In Albania, Manfred's second in command, Philip Cinardi was assassinated after a plot organized by the Despotate of Epirus. Despite the success in their plot, the Epirotes would not gain control over Albania. After Manfred's death, the Treaty of Viterbo signed in 1267 recognized Charles I's rights over Manfred's Albanian territories. Gazo Chinard, who was either the brother or son of Philip Cinardi, initially tried to persuade local Albanian nobles to submit these lands to Charles, and was later appointed Vicar General of the Kingdom of Albania in 1272. The Hohenstaufen lands in Albania would meet a similar fate to Sicily, falling to the Angevins with little resistance.

== Politics and influence ==
=== Administration ===
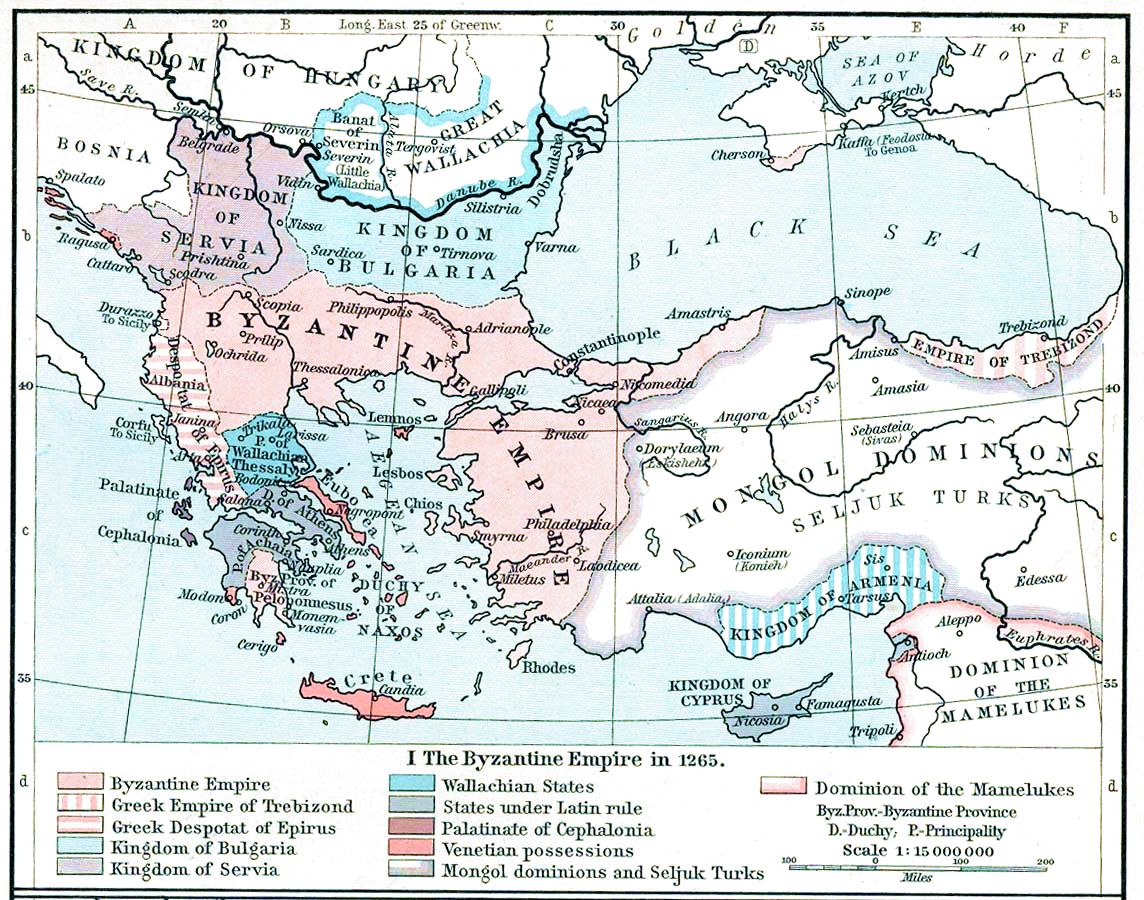
Map of the restored Byzantine Empire of Michael VIII Palaiologos in 1265, including the Manfred's estate in Albania

The Hohenstaufen controlled several cities in Albania. Durazzo was their capital in the region. Their secondary capital, Corfu, was the seat of second in command, Philip Cinardi, who acted as the ruler of the Hohenstaufen in Albania when Manfred was campaigning in Italy. Eventually Philip would move his seat to Kaninë.

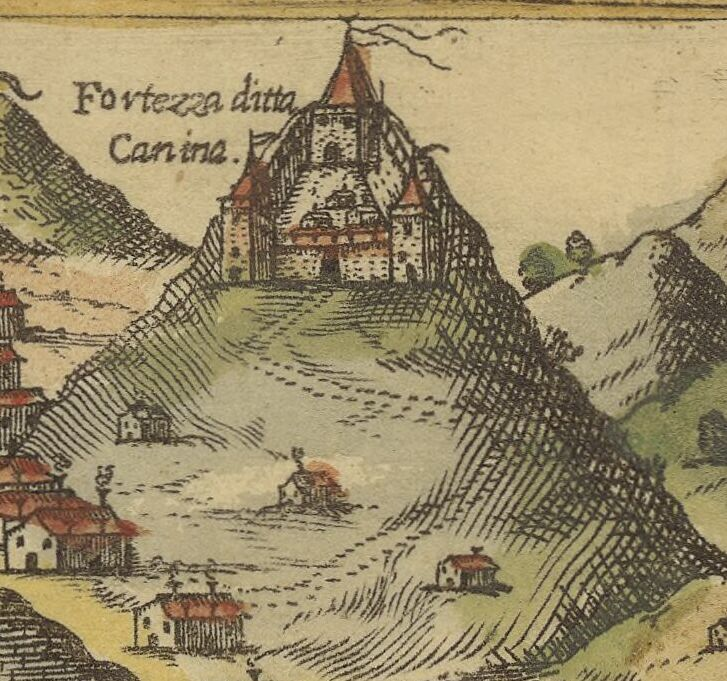
1571 depiction of Kaninë Castle

Castles played a very important role in the Hohenstaufen territories. Mostly built around cities, they would serve not only for protection but also to mark municipalities. Each municipality would have its own lord, which was usually Italian or German, however in some situations they were also Albanian nobles. These municipalities would make up different provinces, the biggest of which was the Province of Kaninë, which was governed by Jacob Blasiniani. It included Kaninë itself, together with Vlorë, Orikum, Vranisht and Vonicë. The Castle of Kaninë was also the most important. All of the nobles in Hohenstaufen Albania had to perform garrison duty inside the castle for one month each year.

=== Alliances ===
The invasion of Albania formed a new sphere of influence for the Hohenstaufen in the Balkans. This influence would be achieved through many alliances. Their most crucial alliances were with the Albanian lords, who accepted Manfred as their king and gave their lands without resistance. Many of the Albanian nobles still continued to hold high titles. One of these noblemen was Andrea Vrana who would also become a captain of the Hohenstaufen military. Additionally, many Albanians made-up Manfred's army and even took part in his campaigns in Italy.

Manfred also formed alliances with other countries in the region. His alliance with Despotate of Epirus secured him lands in Southern Albania and Epirus and an ally against the Empire of Nicea. Manfred would also become part of a wider anti-Nicene alliance in the region, which besides Epirus and the Hohenstaufen, also included the Principality of Achaea, the Duchy of Athens, the Duchy of Naxos and the Triarchy of Negroponte.

== See also ==
- Albania under Serbia in the Middle Ages
- Albania under the Byzantine Empire
- Albania under the Bulgarian Empire
- Albania in the Middle Ages

== Sources ==
- Anamali, Skënder (2002). Historia e popullit shqiptar I, Mesjeta [The history of the Albanian people I, Middle ages]. Toena. ISBN 9789992716229. OCLC 52411919.
- Mihajlovski, Robert (2006). "The Battle of Pelagonia 1259: A New Look through the March Routes and Topography". Byzantinoslavica. 64: 275–284. ISSN 0007-7712.
- Treadgold, Warren T. (1997). A History of the Byzantine State and Society. Stanford University Press. ISBN 9780804726306.
- Geanakoplos, Deno John (1953). "Greco-Latin Relations on the Eve of the Byzantine Restoration: The Battle of Pelagonia–1259". Dumbarton Oaks Papers. 7: 99–141. doi:10.2307/1291057. JSTOR 1291057.
- Oman, Charles (2012). A History of the Art of War: The Middle Ages from the Fourth to the Fourteenth Century. Tales End Press. ISBN 978-1-62358-003-2.
- Nicol, Donald M. (1993). The Last Centuries of Byzantium, 1261–1453. Cambridge University Press. ISBN 9780521439916.
- Bartusis, Mark C. (1997). The Late Byzantine Army: Arms and Society 1204–1453. Philadelphia, Pennsylvania: University of Pennsylvania Press. ISBN 978-0-8122-1620-2.
