= Glavinica (medieval town) =

Glavinica or Glavenica was a medieval town that was located in present-day southern Albania. It is mentioned in the "Short Life" of Clement of Ohrid as one of the three places of rest provided by the Bulgarian prince Boris I (r. 852–889) to Clement. It is known that the town foll within the historical district of Kutmichevitsa, but its exact location is unknown. Some modern scholars believe that the city was located on the site of the modern town of Ballsh, where in 1918 the Austrian army discovered a column with an inscription testifying to the baptism of the Bulgarians during the reign of Prince Boris. In the "Short Life" it is mentioned that he left such monuments around Glavinica, which in the beginning of the 13th century could still be seen around Balshi. According to other assumptions, the city was located near the city of Vlora. Glavenitsa was the center of one of the main dioceses of the Ohrid Archbishopric, including the fortress of Kanina.
