= Kutmichevitsa =

Historical region

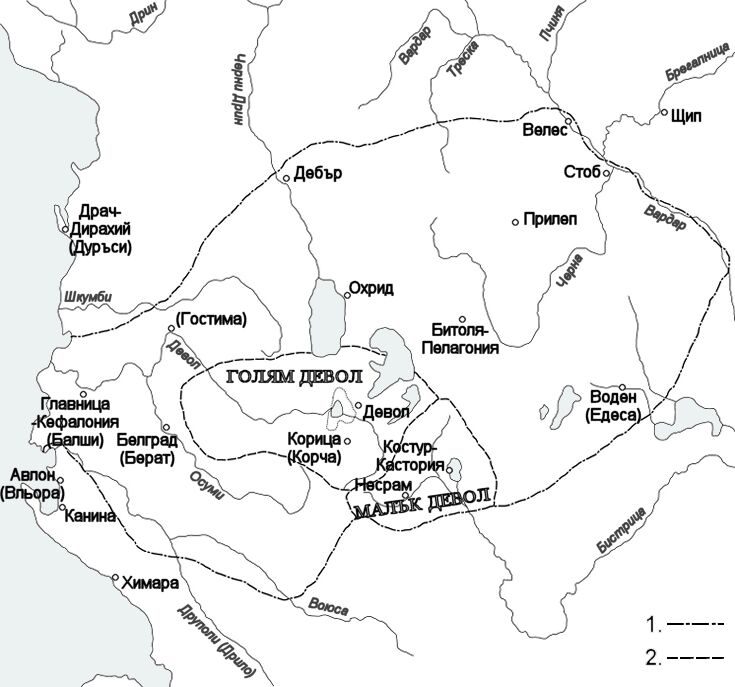
The borders of the Kutmichevitsa or Devol Comitatus during 9th-10th centuries.

Kutmichevitsa (Bulgarian: Кутмичевица) was an administrative region of the Bulgarian Empire during 9th-11th cent., corresponding roughly with the northwestern part of the modern region of Macedonia and the southern part of Albania, broadly taken to be the area included in the triangle Saloniki-Skopje-Vlora. It had an important impact on the formation, endorsement and development of the Old Church Slavonic and culture. The Debar–Velich diocese of the Bulgarian Orthodox Church was created in Kutmichevitsa whose first bishop between 886 and 893 was Clement of Ohrid, appointed by Knyaz Boris I.

== Borders ==
To the north Kutmichevitsa reached the river Shkumbin and the ridge Chermenika (Çermenikë) which also divide northern from southern Albania and form the border between the Gheg and Tosk Albanian; to the east and north-east was separated from Macedonia by the Lake Ohrid and Lake Prespa; to the south and south-east bordered the historical region Epirus and to the west reached the plains of the Adriatic Sea known as Myzeqe or Savrovo Pole. The area between the rivers Devoll and Osum was known in the Middle Ages as Mezhdurechie.

== History ==
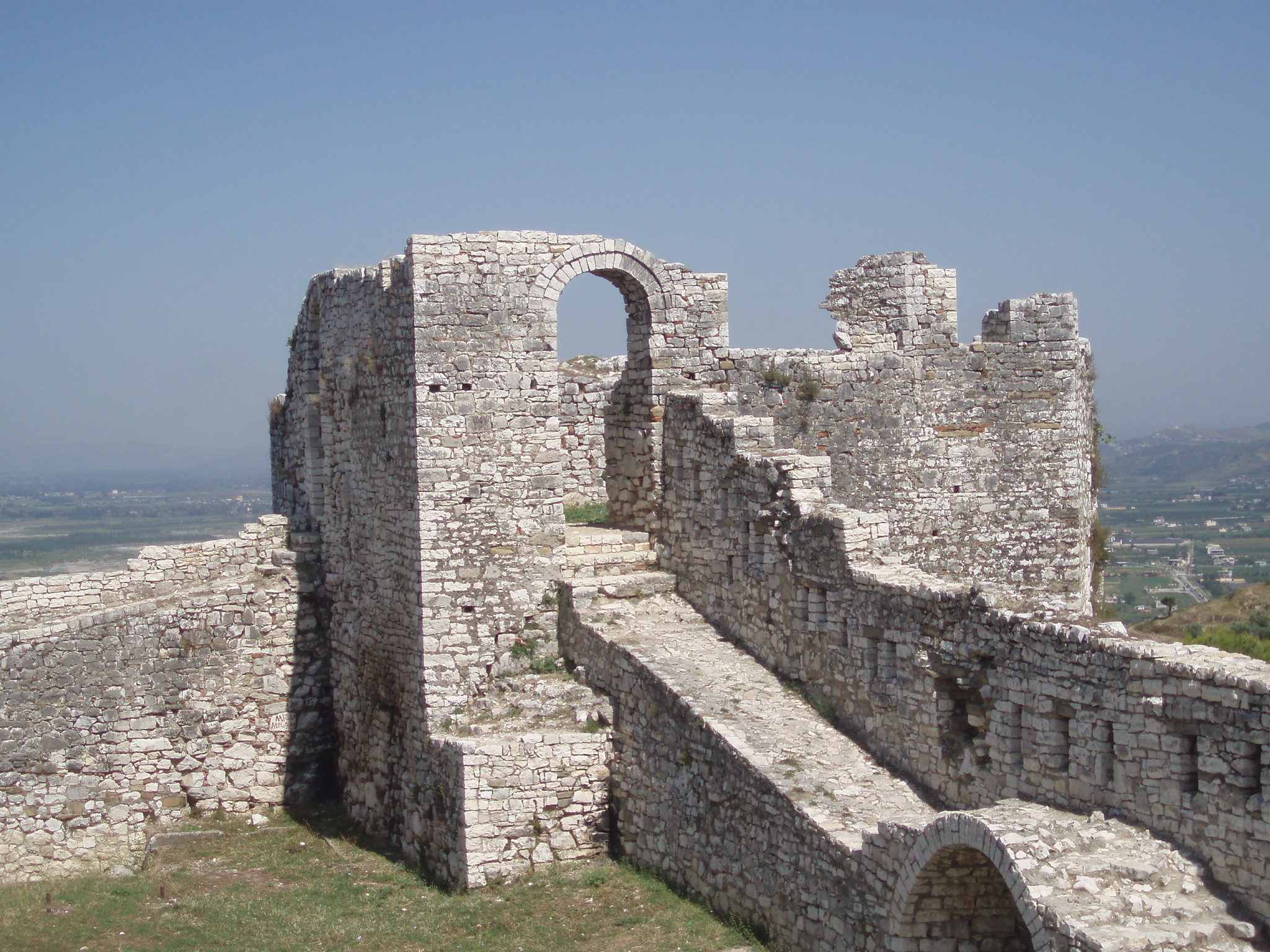
The Berat Castle, known during the Bulgarian rule as the Belgrad Castle was the fortress of one of the most important towns in Kutmichevitsa, Belgrad (White Town).

The region is associated with the spreading of Cyrillic, Old Church Slavonic language and Eastern Orthodox culture.

It was populated by Slavs as early as the 6th century. By the late 7th century, a group of Bulgars under Kuber settled in the area and in neighbouring Macedonia. In 842, during the reign of Khan Presian I, the region became part of the First Bulgarian Empire. During the Christianization of Bulgaria under Presian's son Boris I, Kutmichevitsa became one of the two most important cultural centers of Bulgaria, the other being the original core of the Bulgarian state around Pliska and Preslav. The Ohrid Literary School produced many works important for the Medieval Bulgarian literature as well as for all the Slavic peoples. Kutmichevitsa (or Devol) was probably one of the 10 comitati (administrative regions) of the Bulgarian Empire, with Devol/Deabolis as its capital which also served as a seat of the diocese of the name. Other important towns included Glavinitsa (Ballsh), Belgrad/Velegrada (Berat) and Chernik. Kutmichevitsa remained in Bulgaria until the fall of the empire under Byzantine rule by the armies of Basil II in 1018. The last ruler of the First Empire, Presian II, made his final desperate stand in that region, in the mountain Tomoritsa (Tomorr). By 1019 the Byzantines captured the last Bulgarian strongholds in Kutmichevitsa.

The population of the region took part in the Uprising of Petar Delyan (1040–1041) and the Uprising of Georgi Voiteh (1072) against Byzantine rule. Kutmichevitsa was retaken by Kaloyan of the Second Bulgarian Empire in 1203. During that time Devol was once again administrative center of a hora (an administrative division of the Second Empire). In the turmoil following the death of Ivan Asen II in 1241, the region shared the fate of neighbouring Macedonia and was conquered by the Byzantines. It was finally lost to Bulgaria during the Uprising of Ivaylo.

It remained by Byzantine hands until Stephen Dušan seized it as part of the short-lived Serbian Empire. After its disintegration the region became part of the Principality of Valona and was ruled by the niece of the Bulgarian emperor Ivan Alexander like lord of the rest of the Serbian Empire and later by her daughter from Balša II, Ruđina Balšić. After the battle of Savra Kutmichevitsa came under Ottoman vassalage and in 1417 was fully conquered by the Ottoman Empire.

== Name ==
The etymology of the area is hypothesized to be related to Kuber's Kutrigurs. Two golden treasures have been discovered in this area, which belong to these Bulgars. The area to the south was known as Vagenetia (the southern part of the area during the Ottoman Empire was known as Chameria).

== See also ==
- Albania under the Bulgarian Empire
- First Bulgarian Empire
- Second Bulgarian Empire
