= Kaninë Castle =

Castle near Kaninë, Albania

- Kalaja e Kaninës
- Kaninë, in southern Albania
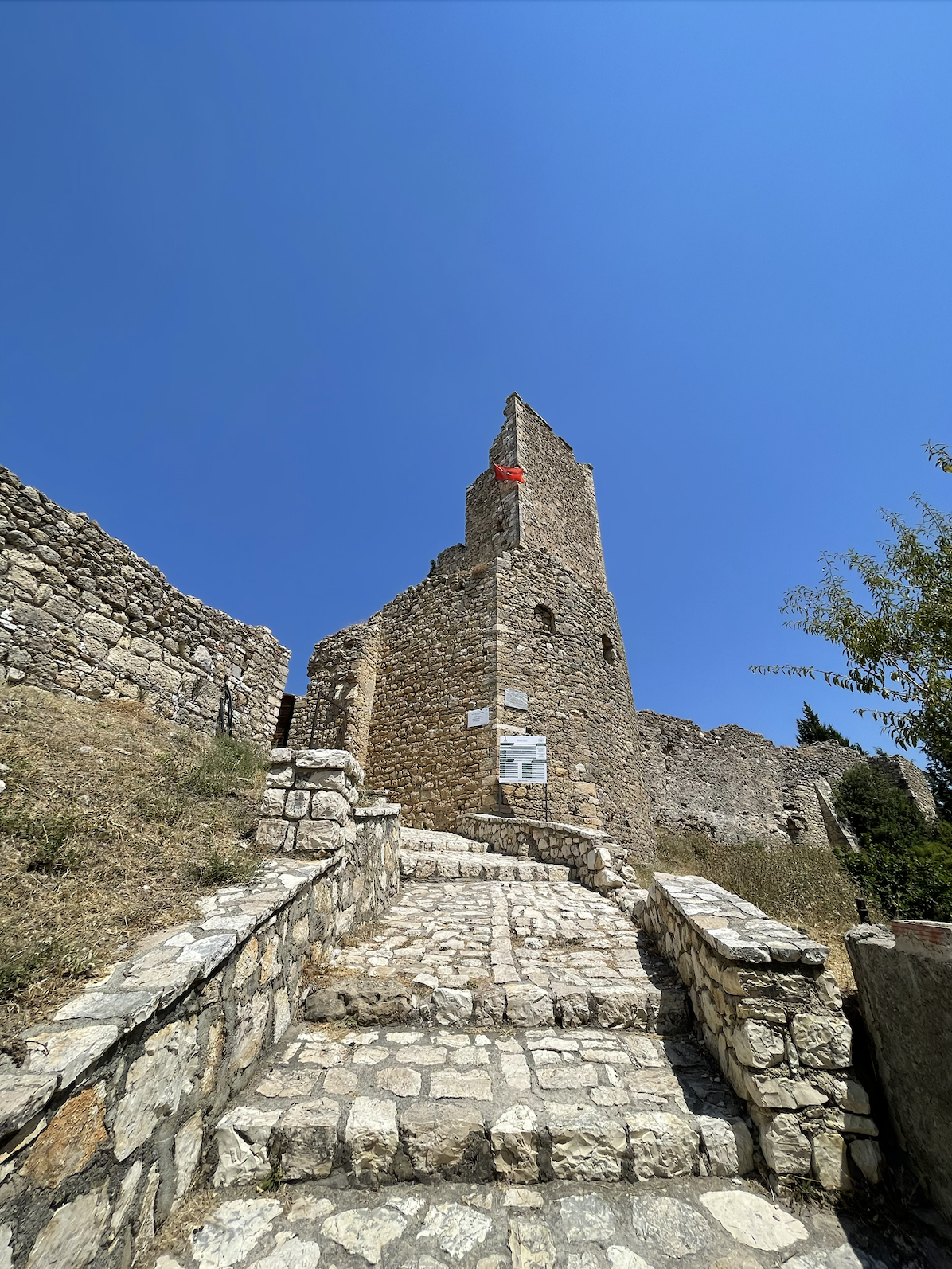
- Entrance to the Castle

Site information
- Owner: Albania
- Controlled by: Byzantine Empire; Hohenstaufen Albania; Kingdom of Albania; Principality of Valona; Republic of Venice; Ottoman Empire; Albania
- Open to the public: Yes

Location
- Coordinates: 40.443°N 19.52°E

Site history
- Built: 3rd century BC, Reconstructed by Justinian I in the 6th century AD

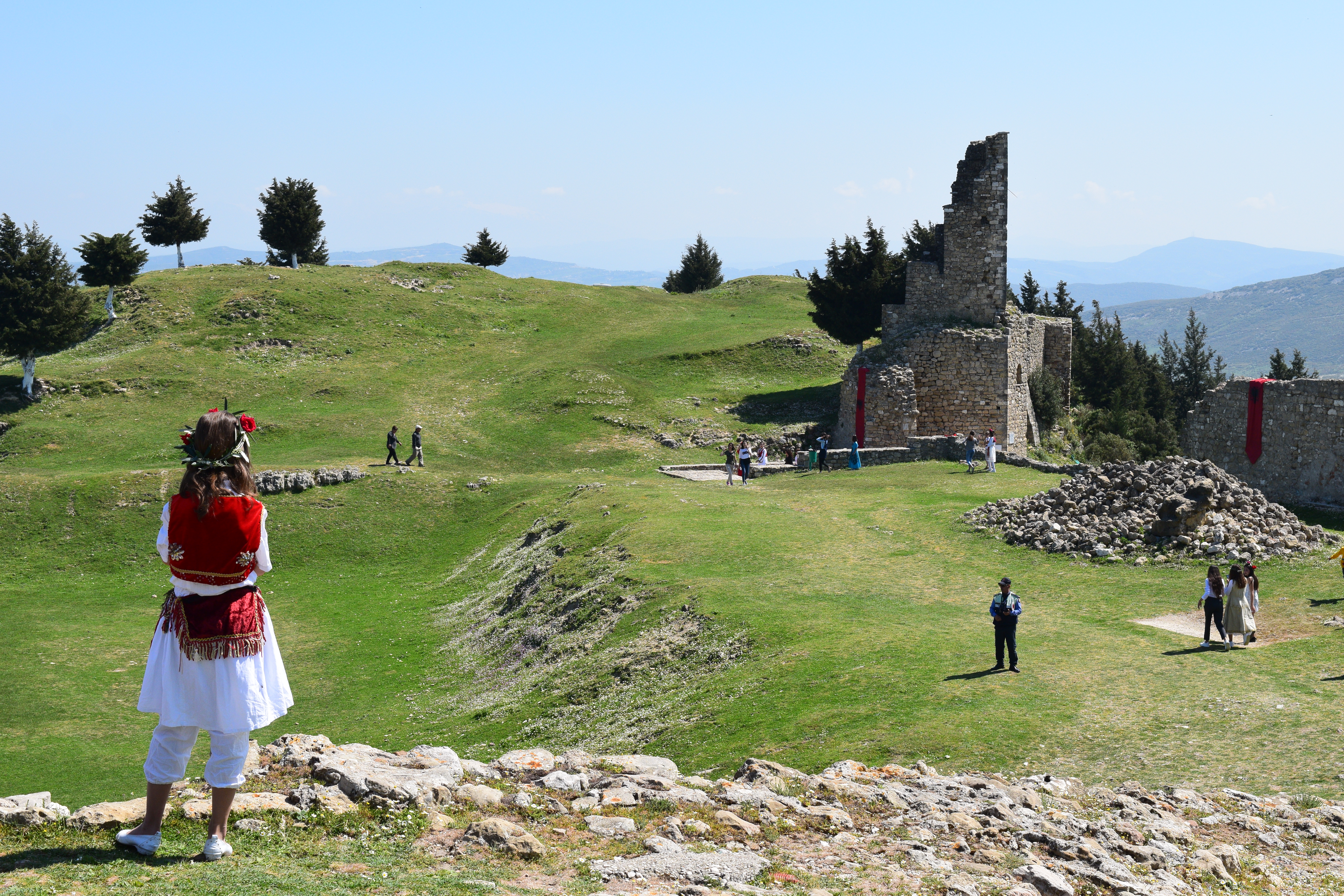
Part of the fortification from inland side

Kaninë Castle (Albanian: Kalaja e Kaninës) is a castle in the village Kaninë near Vlorë, in southwestern Albania.

== History ==
Kaninë Castle was built in the village with the same name which is located about 6 kilometres (4 mi) from Vlorë. The castle rises on the side of the Shushicë Mountain, about 380 metres (1,250 ft) above sea level. It was built on the site of an ancient settlement, one of the oldest in the Vlora region. The castle is believed to have been erected in the 3rd century B.C. In the 4th century A.D. the castle was transformed into a fortress town. In the 6th century A.D. the castle was reconstructed by Justinian I. The castle was the center of the Principality of Valona in the 14th century. The castle would also play an important role during Hohenstaufen Albania. Aside from serving as the main fortification in Albania at the time, it was also the seat of the Province of Kaninë, governed by Jacob Blasiniani. During the Morean War in 1690, the fortress, and nearby Vlorë fell under Venetian control in their attempts to aid the uprising of the local Greek minority. Later that same year the city was besieged by the Ottomans and fell on 17 September.

The settlement covers an area of 3.6 hectares.

== Gallery ==
Depictions of Kaninë Castle by Vincenzo Coronelli
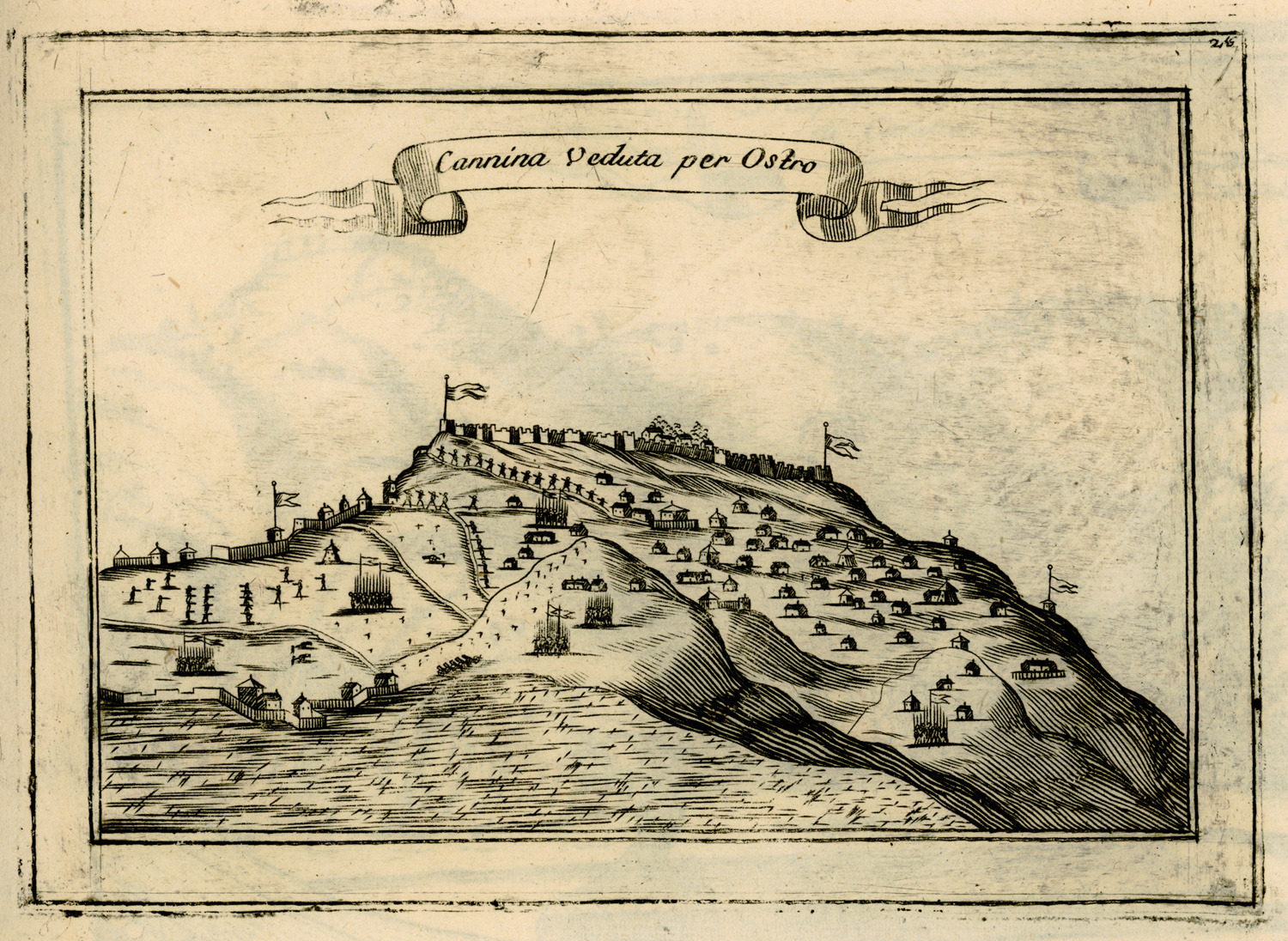
Kaninë Castle from the South

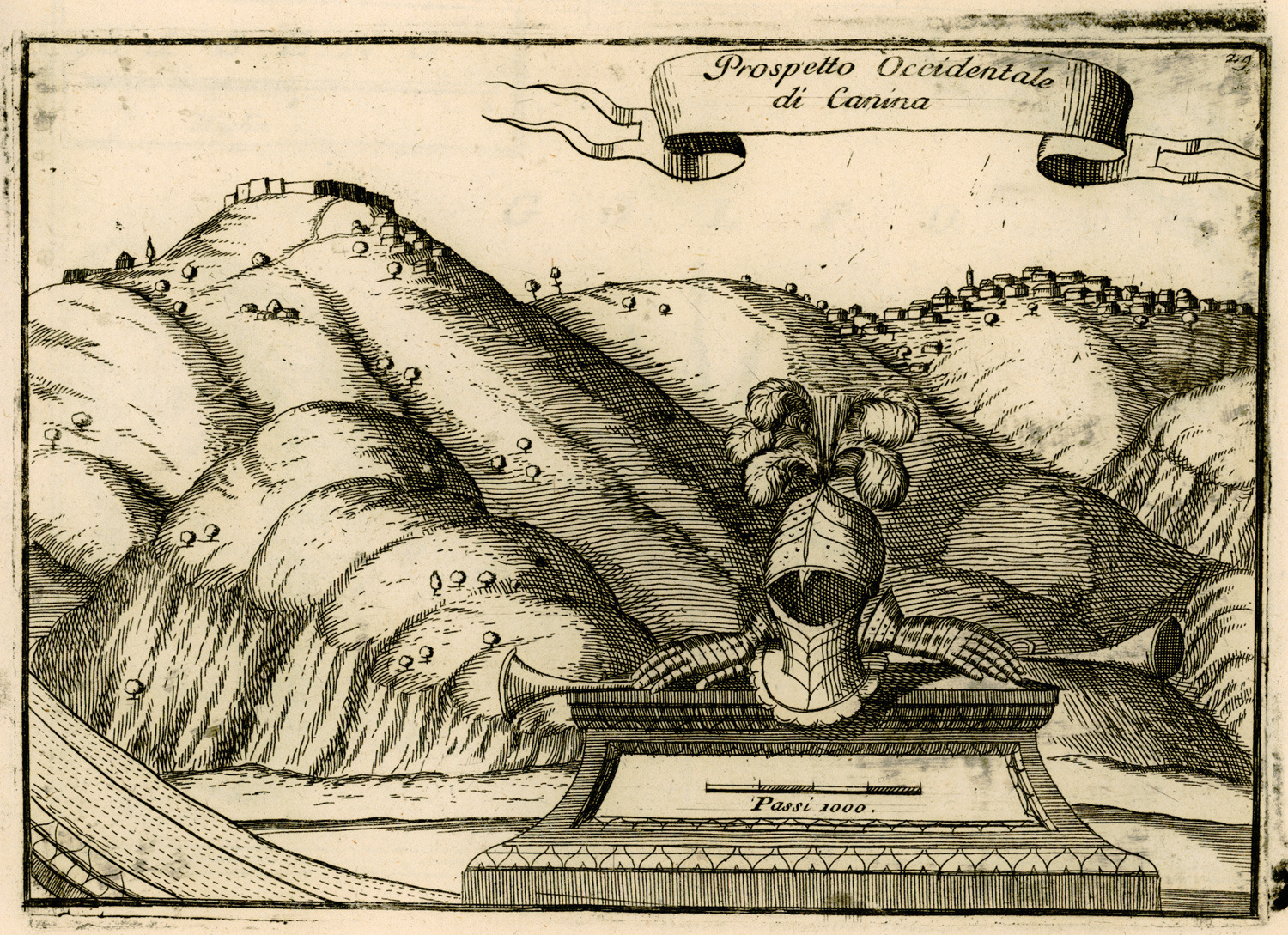
Kaninë Castle from the West

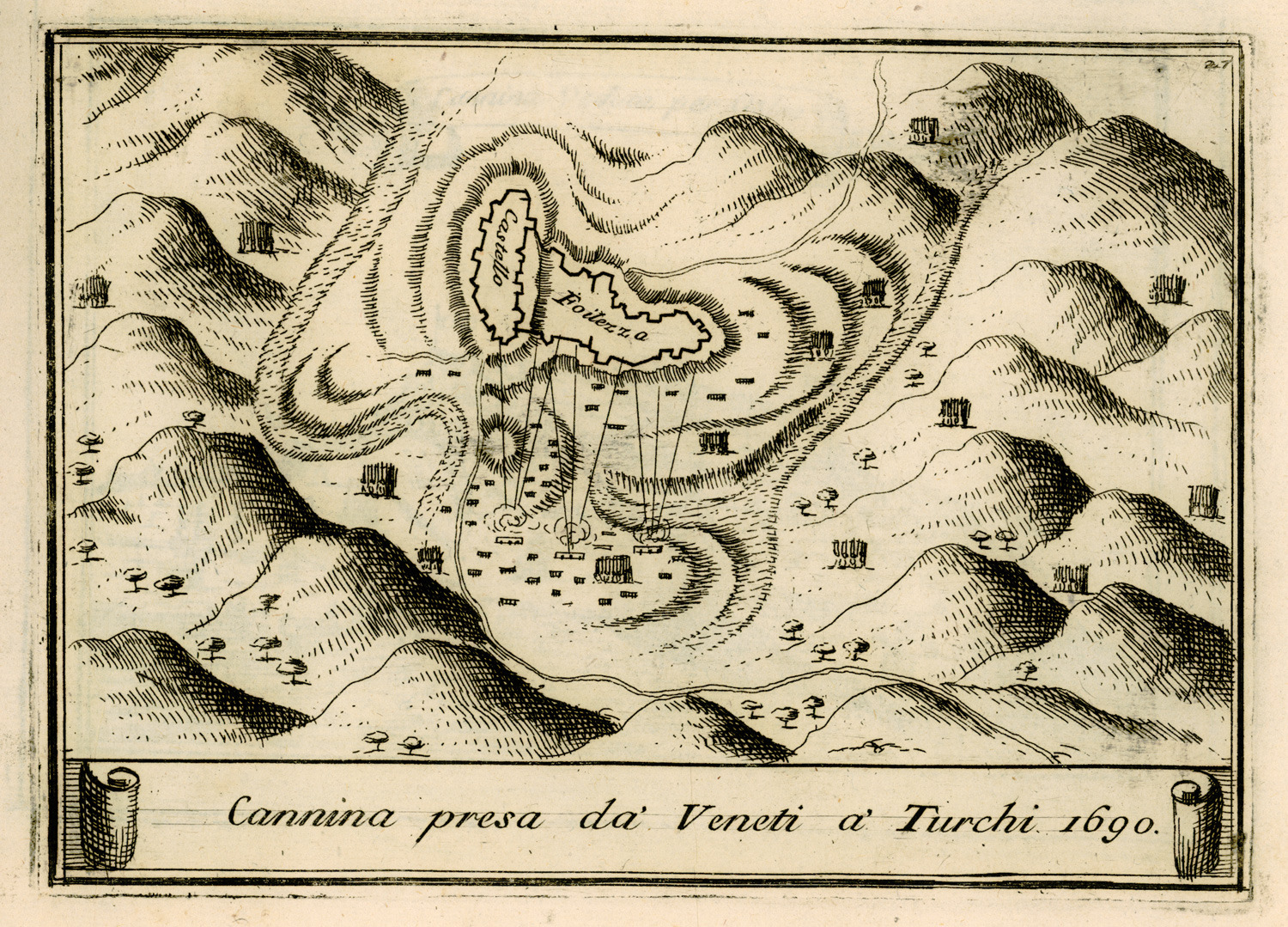
Floor plan of Kaninë Castle, showing the positions of the Venetian army during the siege of 1690, and when Venice took the fortress from the Ottomans

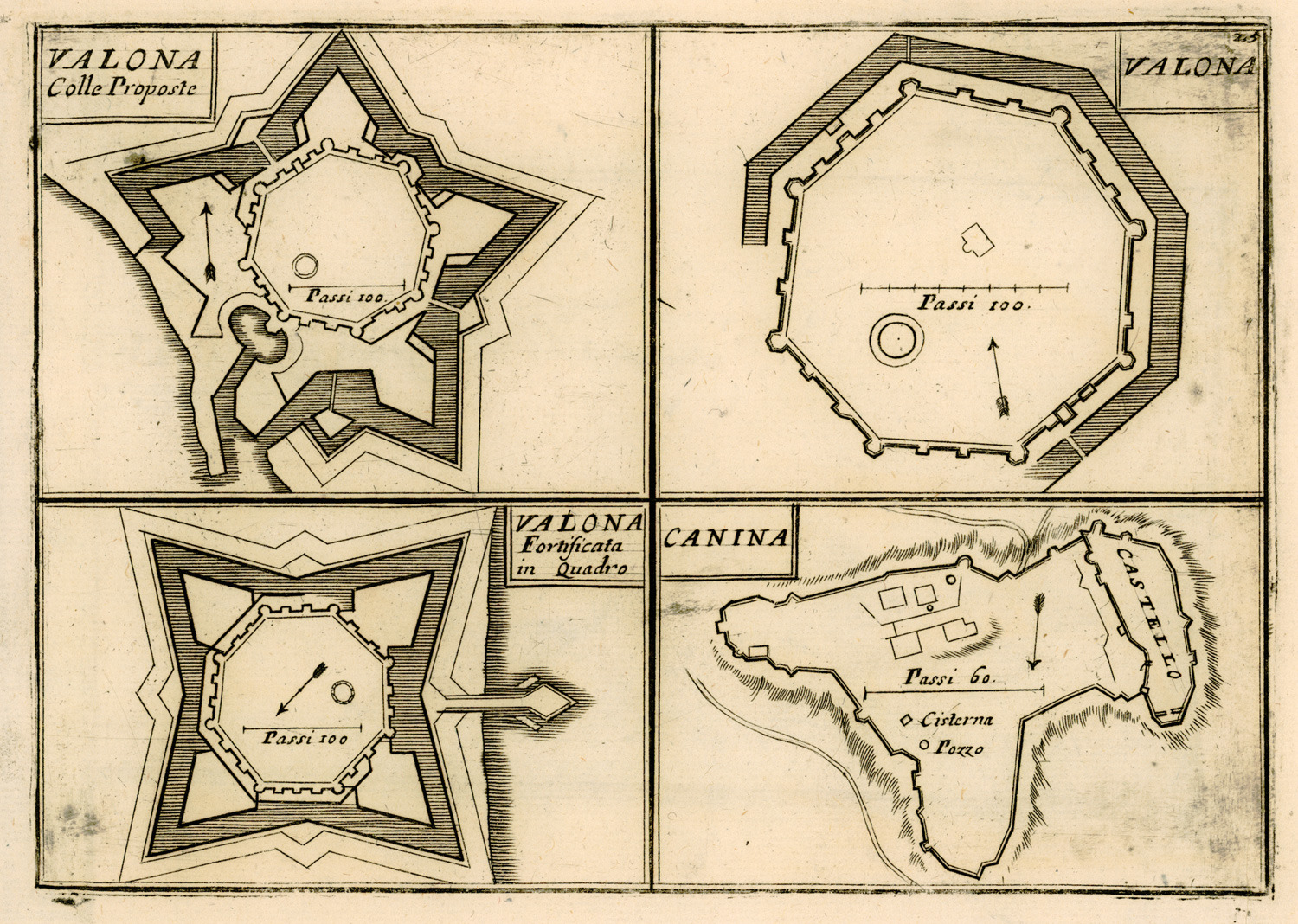
Drawings of the fortifications of Vlorë Castle and Kaninë Castle on the Bottom Right

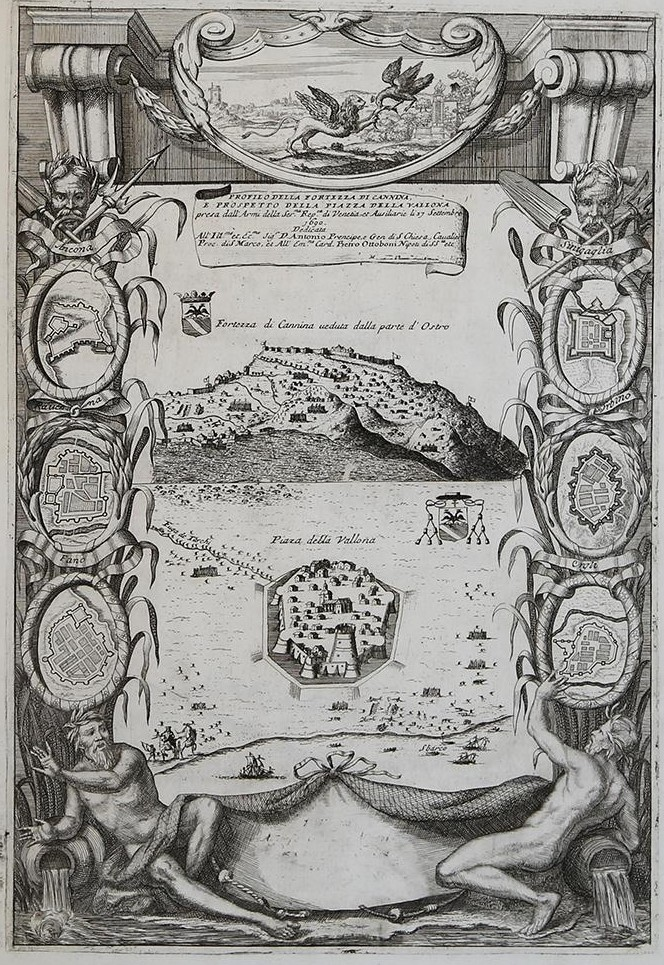
(Top) Kaninë Castle and (Bottom) Vlorë Castle

== See also ==
- Vlore
- List of castles in Albania
- Tourism in Albania
