= Church of Saints Clement and Panteleimon =

Byzantine church in North Macedonia

Coordinates: 41°06′45″N 20°47′27″E

Saints Clement and Panteleimon
- Свети Климент и Пантелејмон; Sveti Kliment i Pantelejmon
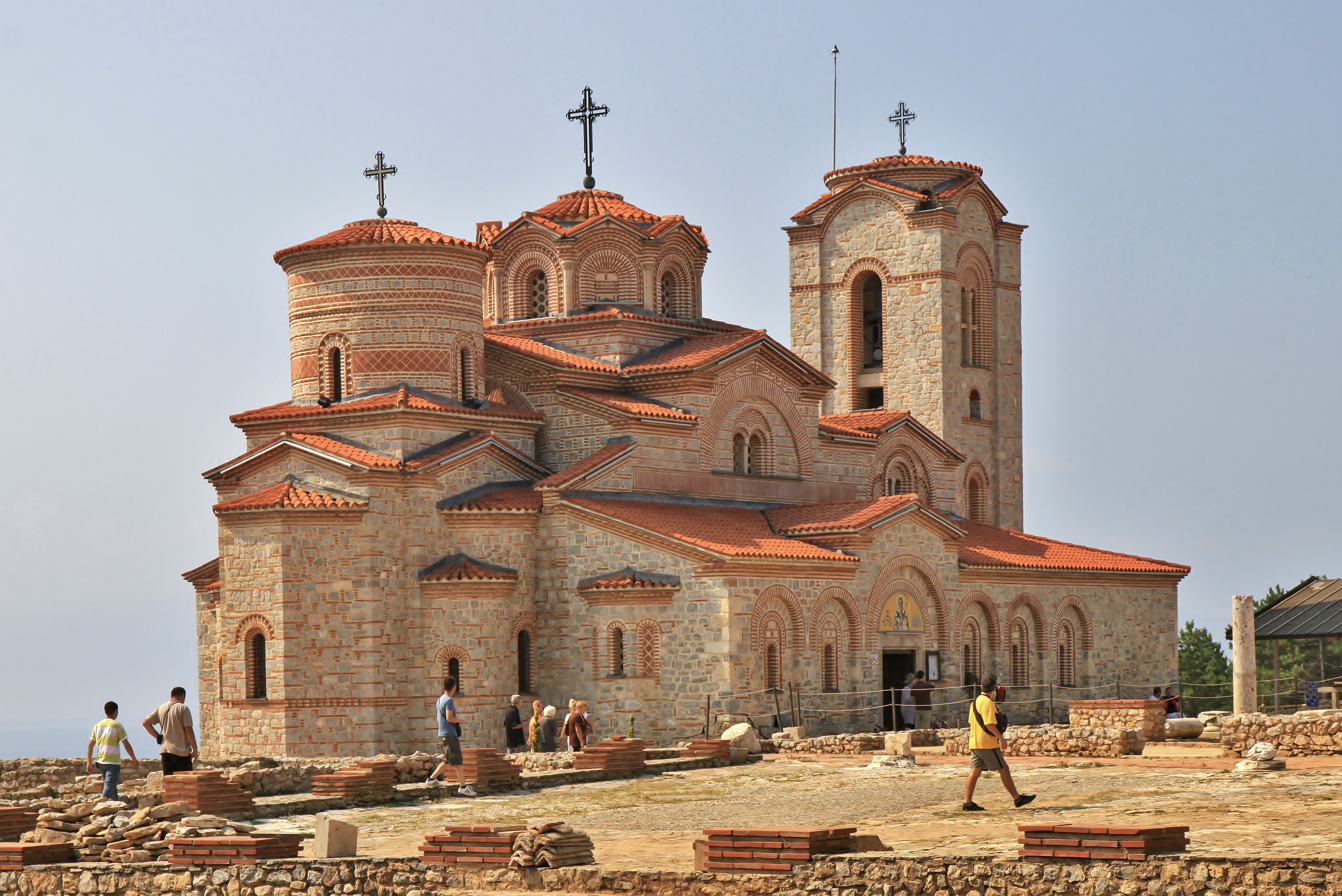
- The exterior of the church

Religion
- Affiliation: Macedonian Orthodox Church (Eastern Orthodox Church)
- District: Plaošnik

Location
- Location: Ohrid, North Macedonia
- Interactive map of Saints Clement and Panteleimon

Architecture
- Architect: Clement of Ohrid
- Type: Middle-Byzantine
- Style: Byzantine style
- Capacity: 3,000

The Church of Saints Clement and Panteleimon (Macedonian: Црква Свети Климент и Пантелеjмон, romanized: Crkva Sveti Kliment i Pantelejmon; ) is a Byzantine church situated on Plaošnik in Ohrid, North Macedonia. It is attributed to Saint Clement of Ohrid, a disciple of Saint Cyril and Saint Methodius. Archaeologists have come to believe that the church is located on the site where the first students of the Glagolitic alphabet (used to translate the Bible into Old Church Slavonic) were taught in the First Bulgarian Empire.

== History ==
The original church is believed to have been built when Saint Clement arrived in Ohrid at the request of Boris I of Bulgaria and restored an old church. Sources say that Saint Clement was not satisfied with the size of the church and therefore built a new one over it and assigned Saint Panteleimon as its patron saint.

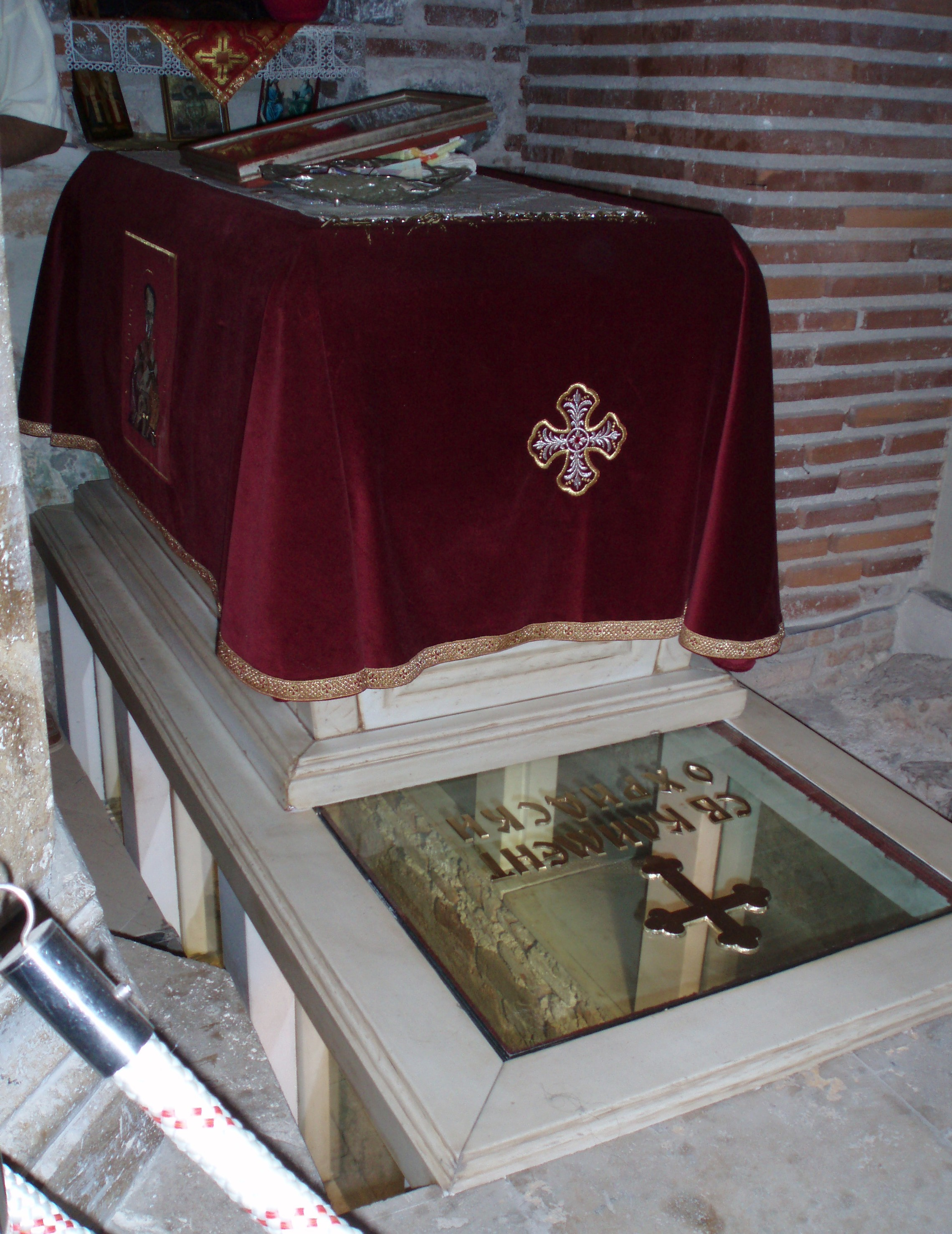
Tomb of Saint Clement

Saint Clement used his newly created church as a liturgical building and a place for teaching his disciples in Old Church Slavonic and Glagolitic alphabet. Clement was buried inside the church after his death in 916; his tomb still exists today.

In the 15th century, Ottoman Turks converted the church into a mosque but during the beginning of the 16th century allowed ruined monasteries and churches to be restored, therefore, so was Saint Clement's church. The church was again ruined during the end of the 16th century or the beginning of the 17th century and another mosque, called Imaret Mosque (Turkish: İmaret Camii), was erected by the Ottomans. The Imaret Mosque was torn down in 2000 with the reason given that it was constructed over the remains of a church in the Plaošnik area and the former mosque was added to the damaged religious buildings list compiled by the Islamic Religious Community of Macedonia.

== Architecture ==
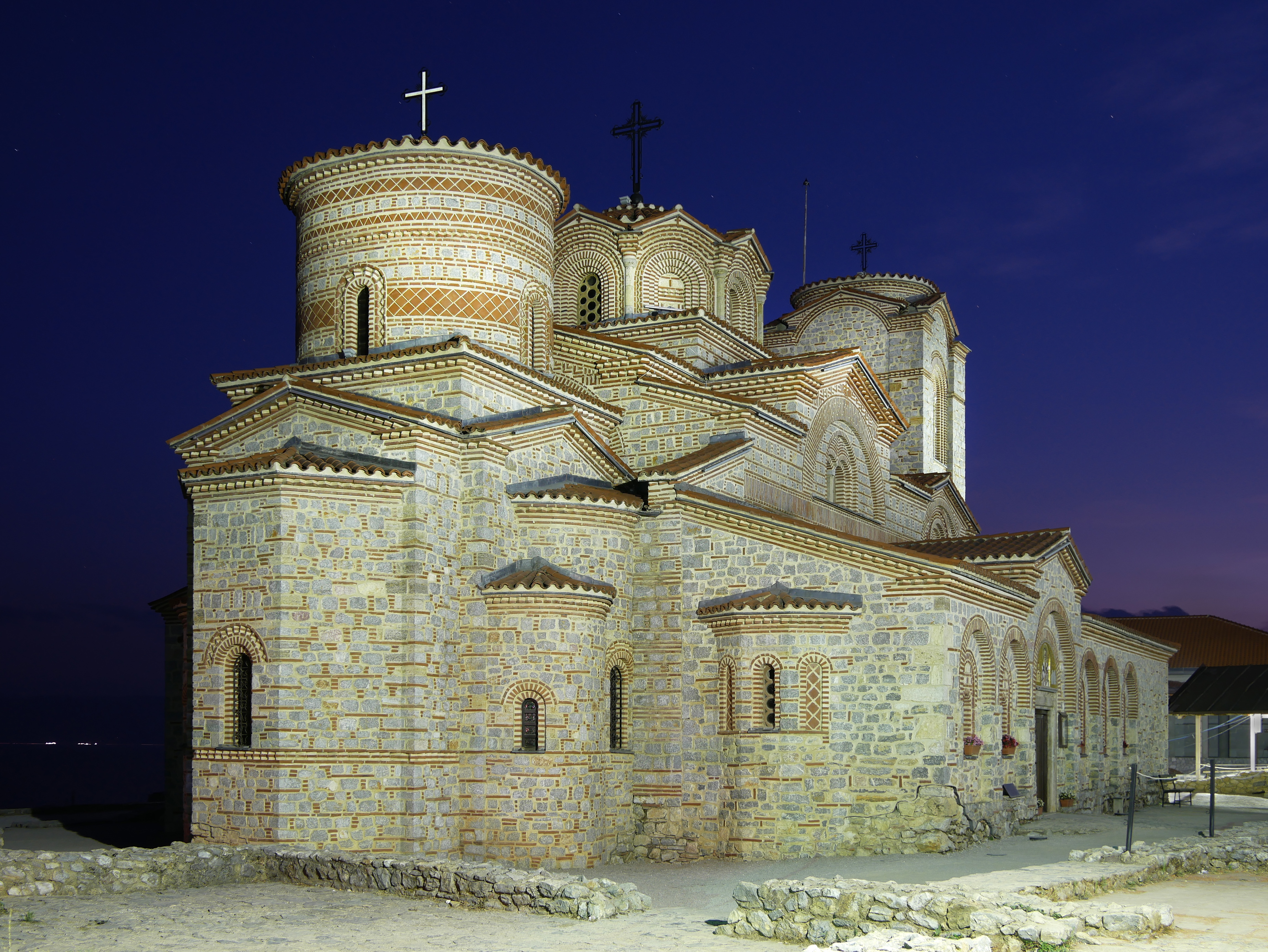
View by night

Many archaeologists believe that Clement himself designed and constructed the church. Clement, along with Naum of Preslav would use the church as a basis for teaching the Glagolitic and Cyrillic alphabets to Christianised Bulgarian Slavs, thus making it a university.

The church stands on a hill which is now known as Plaošnik overlooking Lake Ohrid. Clement built his church on a restored church and a Roman basilica of five parts (the remains of the basilicas can still be seen outside the church). Judging by the architectural style and design of the church, researchers say that Saint Clement intended for his building to be a literary school for disciples, thus it is believed to be the first and oldest discontinued university in Europe.

The exterior of the church contains a large number of finely detailed mosaics not far from a stone baptismal font used to baptise his disciples.

== Reconstruction and excavation ==
The interior and mural of the Church of Saints Clement and Panteleimon in Ohrid

Apart from the church's many reconstructions during the Ottoman Empire, it has recently undergone extensive reconstruction and excavation. Reconstruction started on December 8, 2000 and the physical church was fully reconstructed by August 10, 2002. Most of Saint Clement's relics were returned to the church. A partially ruined bell tower was restored on the right side of the church and the floors of the interior of the church have been reconstructed with marble. Reconstruction was carried out by hand using materials used to build the original church. Machines were only used to polish the interior during the reconstruction of the church. The first excavations of the church were carried out in 1943 by Prof. Dimche Koco. Excavations inside the church have revealed tunnels and crypts. Further excavations have been planned to uncover more remains under the church, including more ruins of the Roman basilicas that stood there (the pillars outside the church support the idea of more remains).

On October 10, 2007, a collection of approximately 2,383 Venetian coins was discovered by archaeologists while excavating the church. A prominent archaeologist of North Macedonia, Pasko Kuzman, stated that the coins are of special significance because they indicate that Ohrid and Venice were commercially linked.

== Tradition ==
As the church is one of the most sacred in North Macedonia, thousands of Macedonian Orthodox Christians gather at Plaošnik during large religious holidays such as Easter and Christmas to celebrate and take part in the liturgies.

== Gallery ==
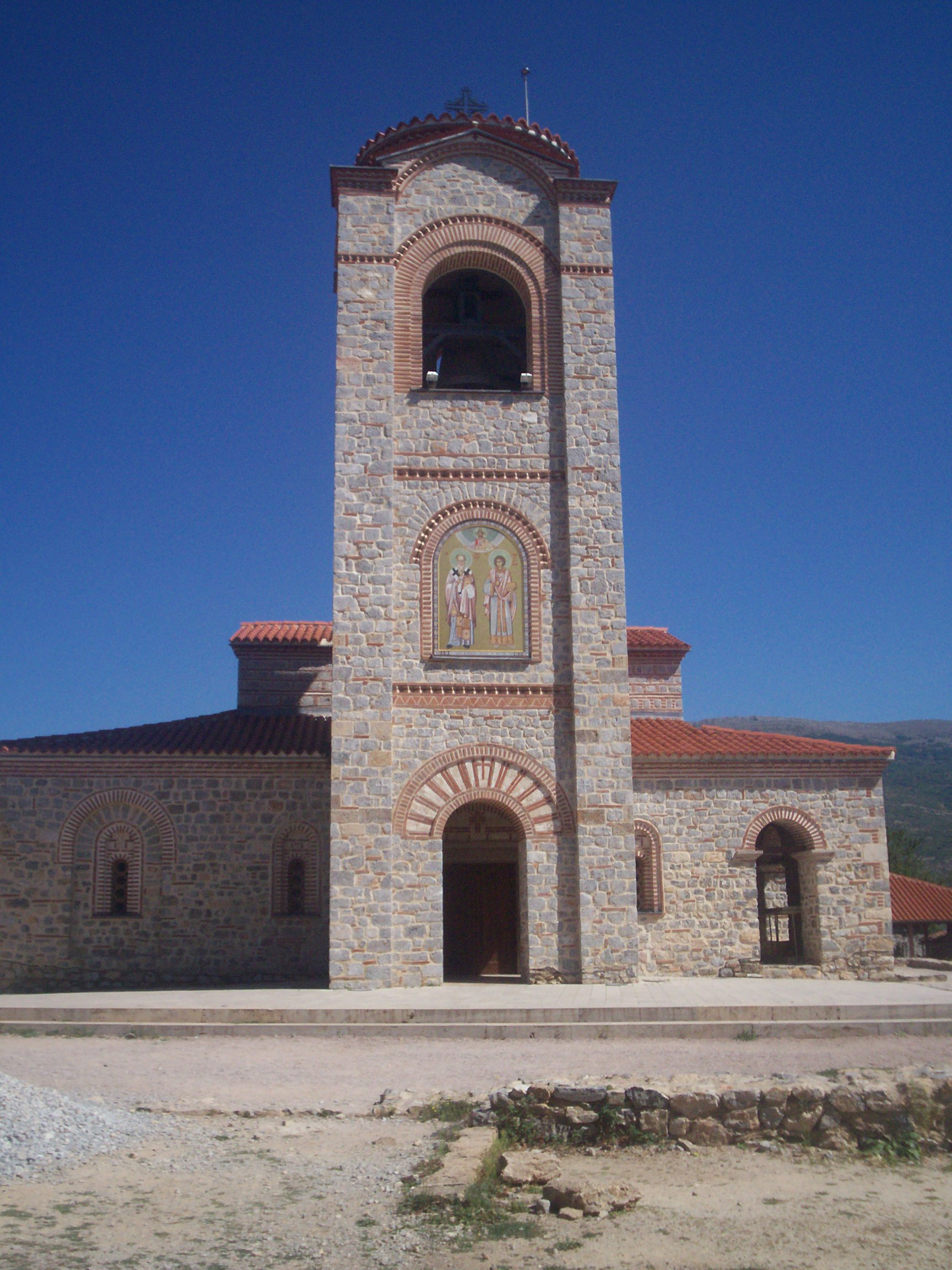
The bell tower on the side of the church. An icon above the entrance depicts Saint Clement and Saint Panteleimon

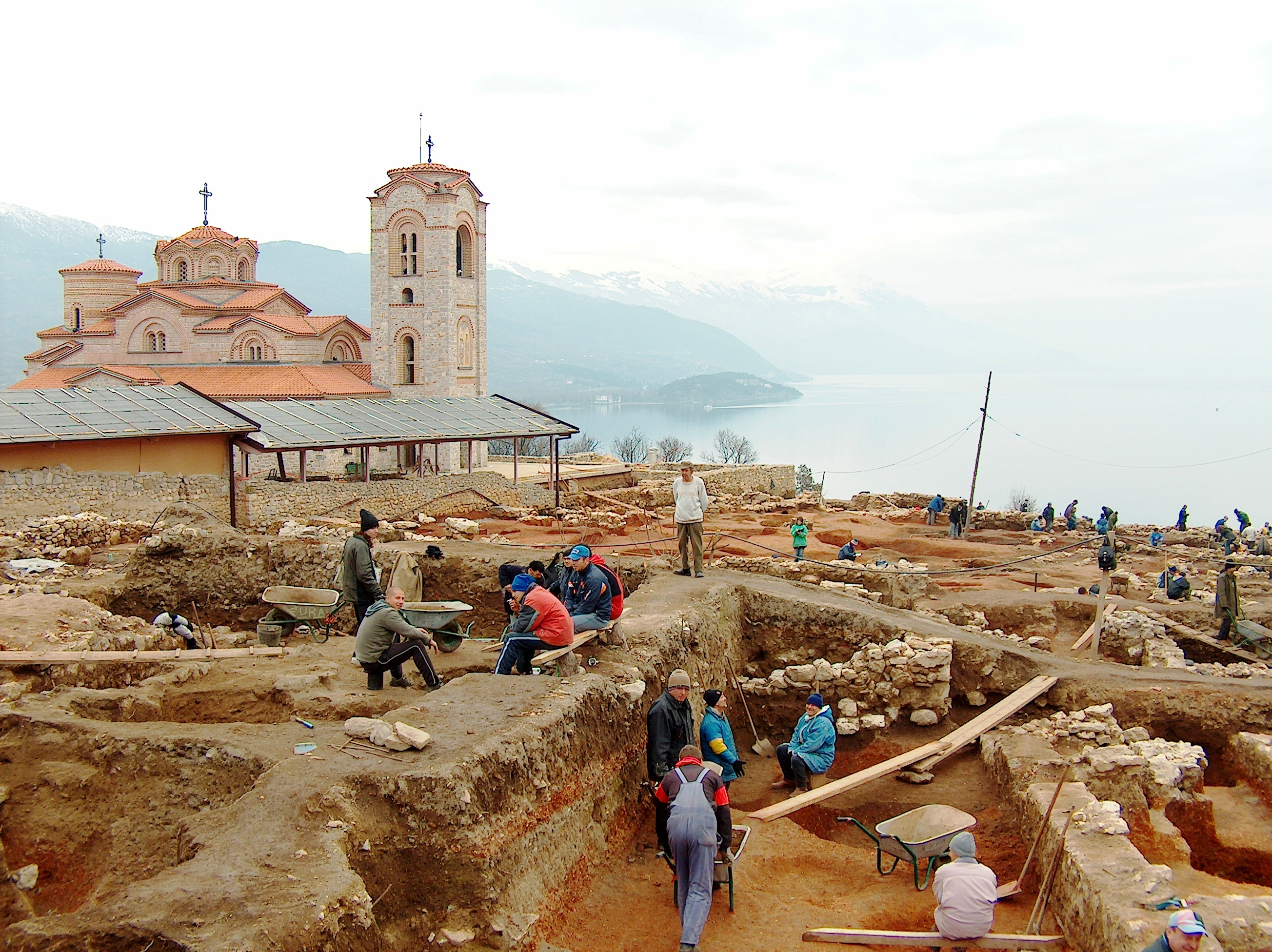
Archeological excavations at Plaošnik

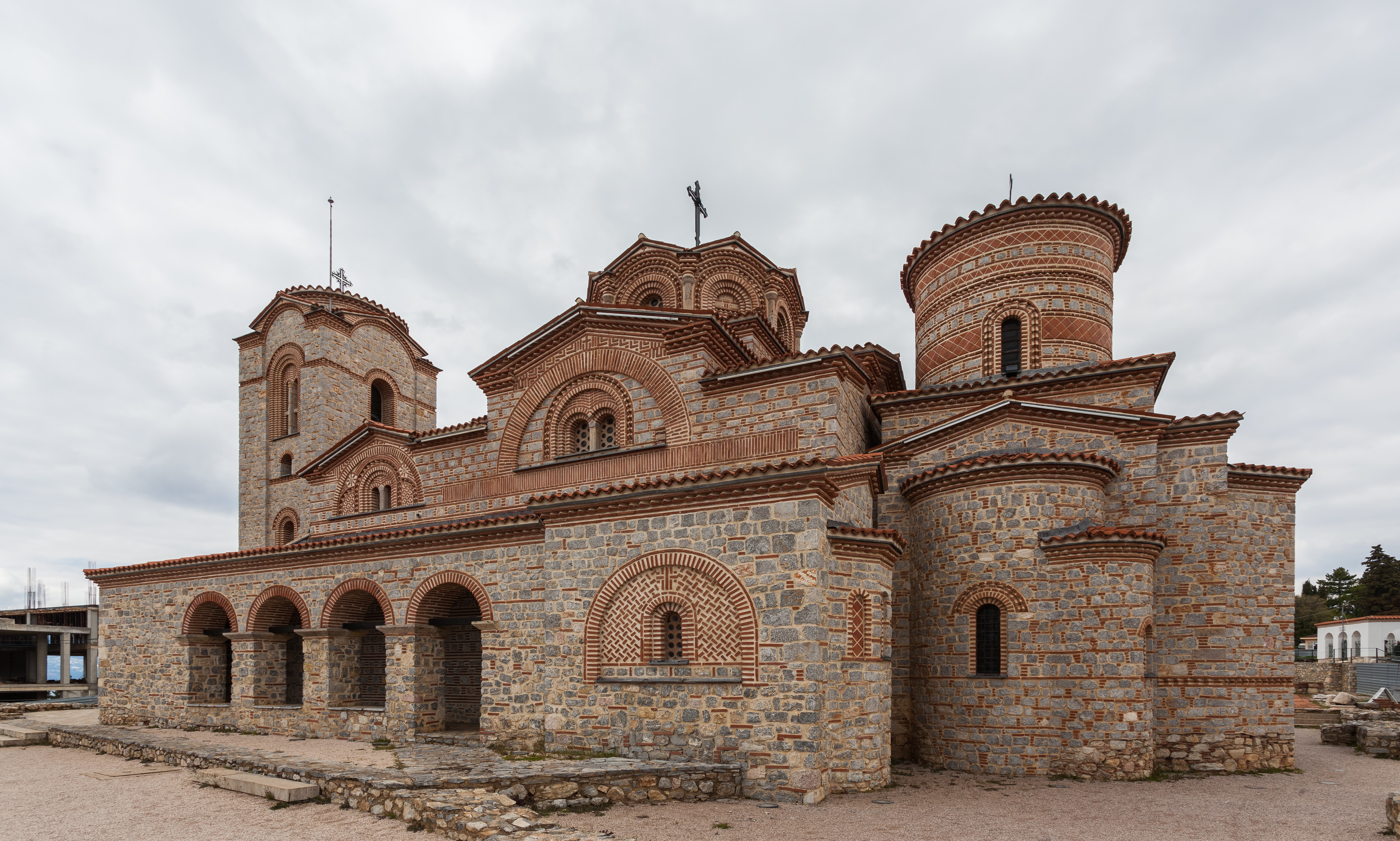
View of the rear side

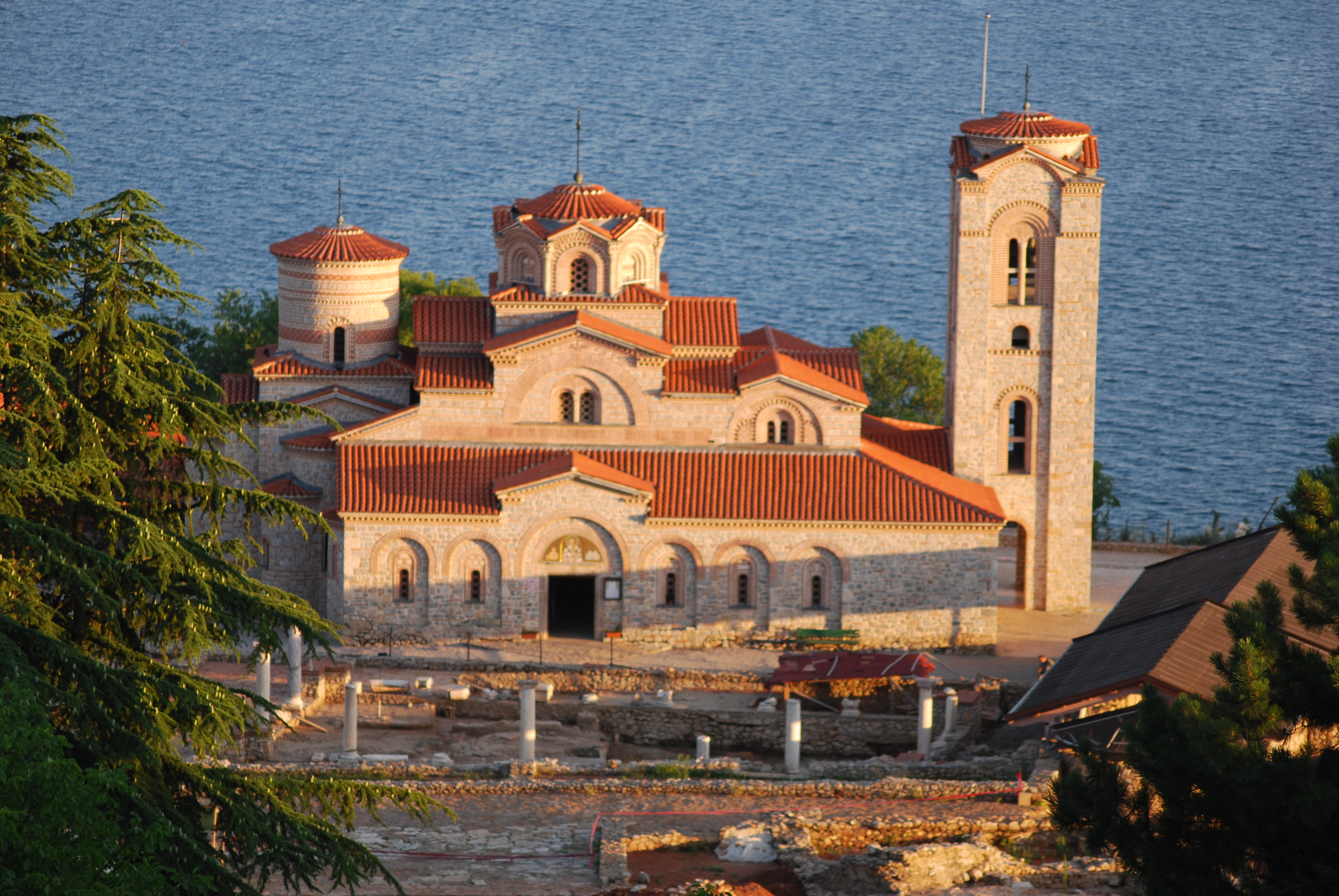
View of the front side

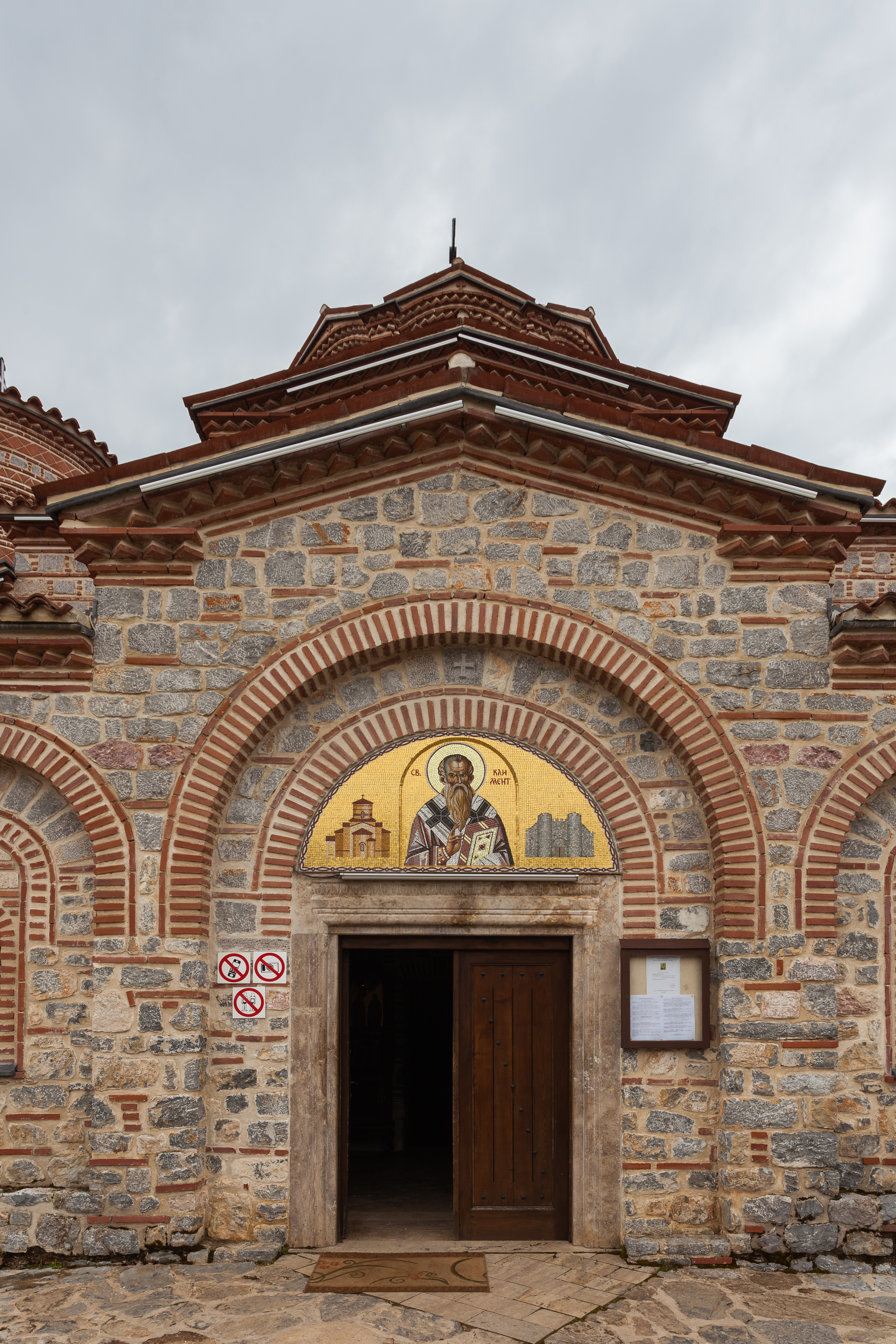
Entry

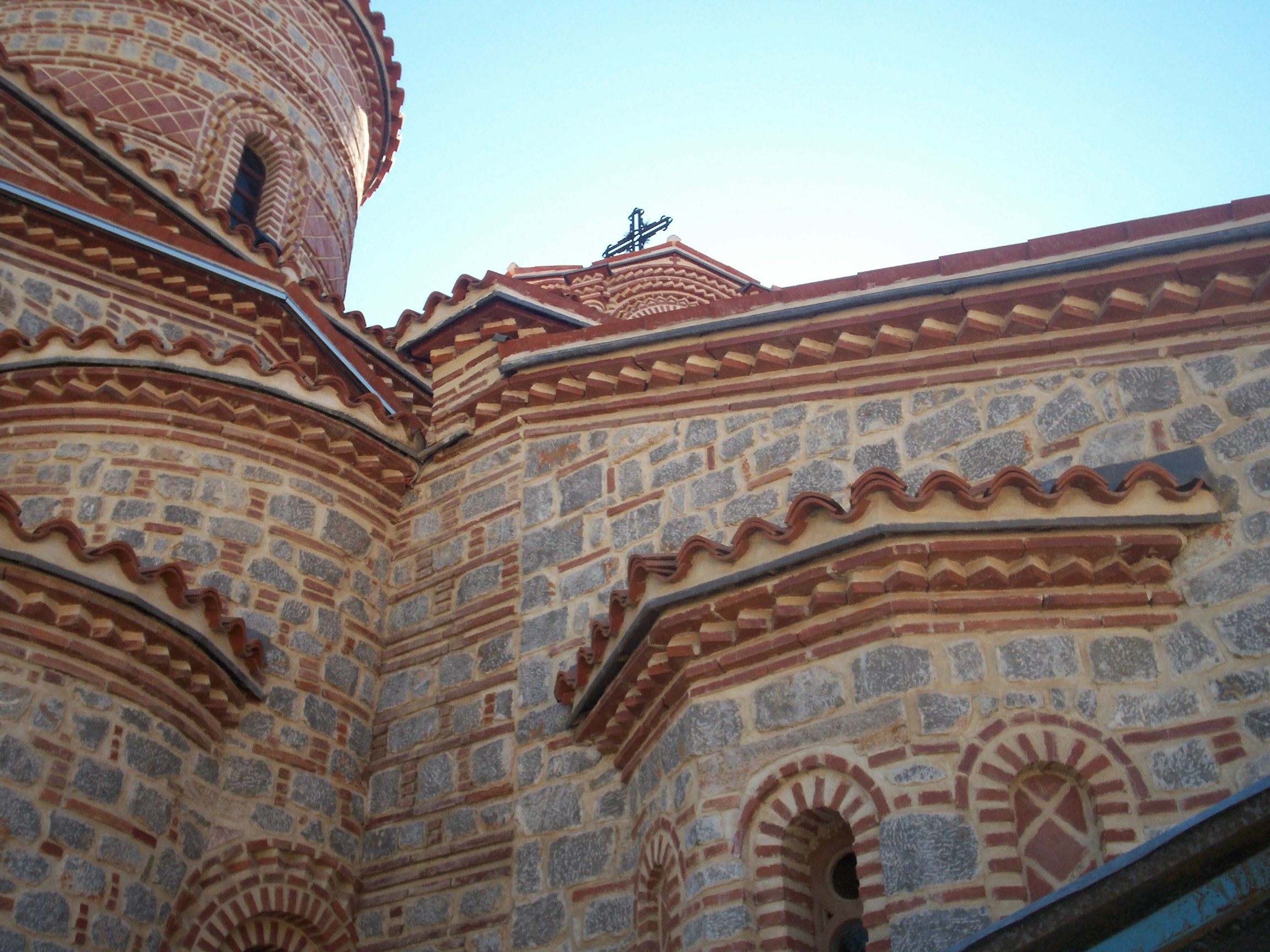
The detailed architectural style of the church

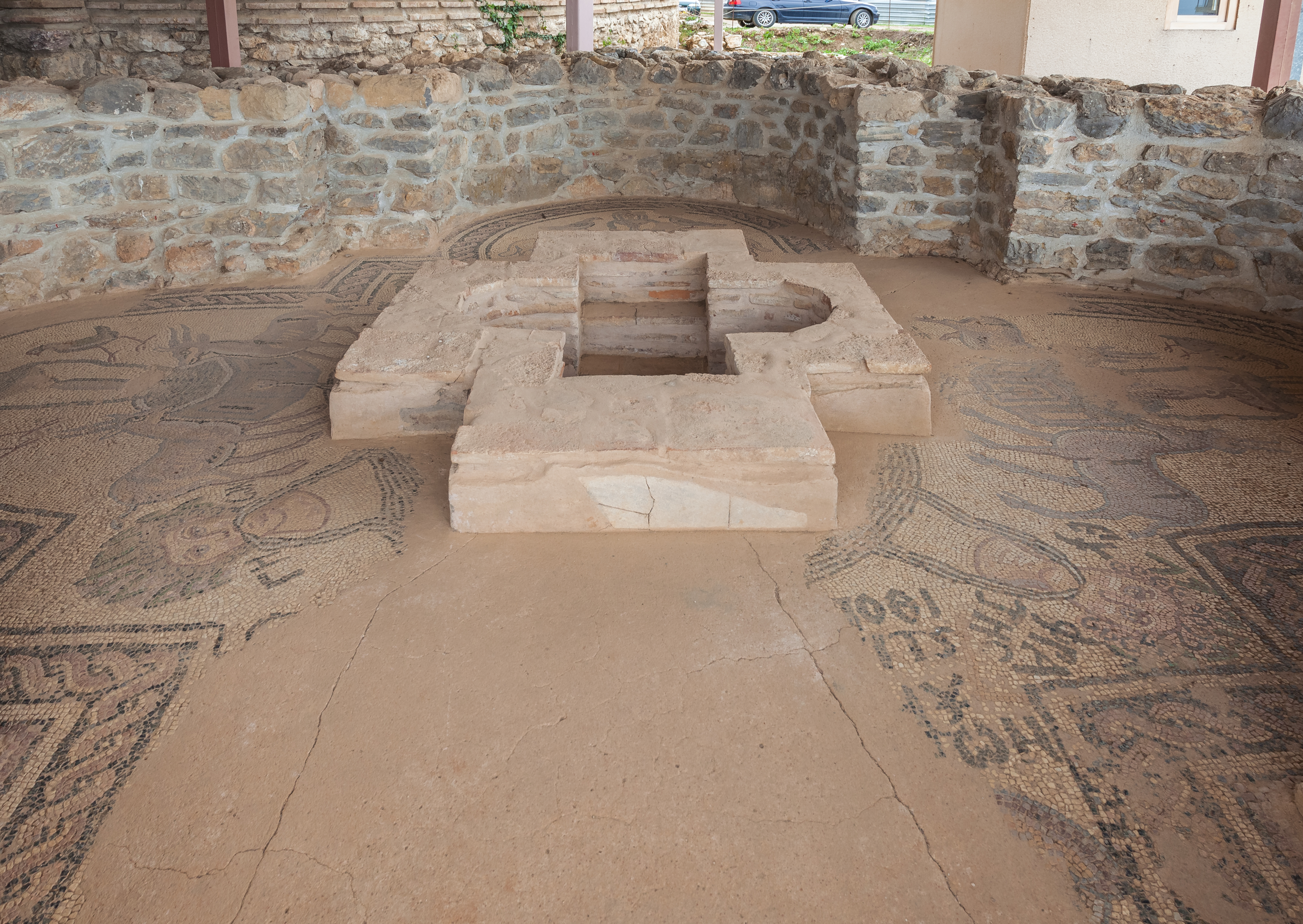
Baptistry and surrounding mosaic floor of an early Christian basilica
