= Andrea Vrana =

Sicilian nobleman

Andrea Vrana (fl. 1261) was an Albanian nobleman appointed by Manfred of Sicily as captain of Durazzo (Durrës). The Vrana family was based in the castle of Xibër village, today in the Mat District.

== Life ==
Andrea Vrana hailed from the well-known local Vrana noble family. The family was based in Xibër village, today in the Mat District. The Byzantine–Norman wars and the Crusades in the 11–12th centuries gave Albanian powerful families an increased political importance. Both Byzantines and Normans made efforts to gain support from them, offering political posts. Amid this, Manfred of Sicily chose to trust the leadership of the imposed military government in Durazzo to Andrea Vrana. He was appointed capitano (captain) of the city. Before that, a relative of him served in 1185 as an official of the Byzantine Empire in the Mat region.

After the death of Manfred in the Battle of Benevento, Vrana refused to give the territories under his jurisdiction to the Despotate of Epirus and Charles I of Anjou. The case of Andrea Vrana shows that Manfred was successful in making alliances with local leaders, some of whom helped against Manfred's adversaries in Italy.

The first mention of Andrea Vrana is dated in 1261–1266 as "capt Arban Cmibri, Andrea Vrana" in an inscription at a church in Rubik, northwestern Albania. Although Vrana set it on fire, parts of the church survived.
