= Clement of Ohrid =

Medieval Slavic scholar

Saint Clement of Ohrid
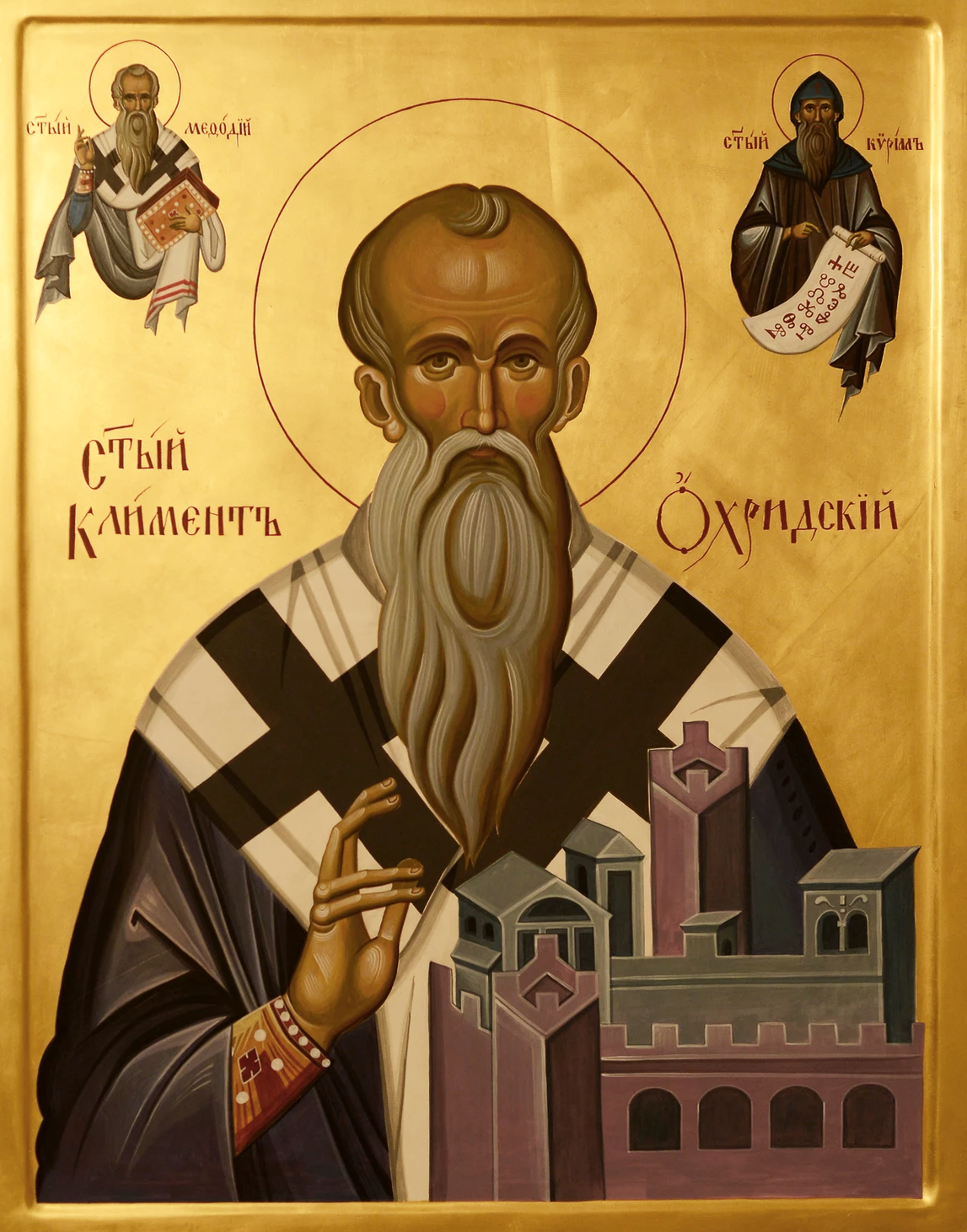
- Icon of Saint Clement of Ohrid from the Orthodox Zograf monastery on Mount Athos in Greece, depicted as a disciple of Saints Cyril and Methodius.

One of the Seven Apostles of Bulgaria, Disciple of Saints Cyril and Methodius
- Born: c. 830–840; Byzantine or First Bulgarian Empire
- Died: July 27, 916 (date of burial); Ohrid, Bulgarian Empire (now North Macedonia)
- Venerated in: Eastern Orthodox Church, Catholic Church
- Feast: 27 July
- Attributes: Glagolitic alphabet, Cyrillic script
- Patronage: Ohrid, North Macedonia

Saint Clement (or Kliment) of Ohrid (Bulgarian, Macedonian, Serbian: Климент Охридски, Kliment Ohridski; Ancient Greek: Κλήμης τῆς Ἀχρίδας, Klḗmēs tē̂s Akhrídas; Slovak: Kliment Ochridský; c. 830 – 916) was one of the first medieval Bulgarian saints, (Note: "He died at an advanced age in 916. His disciples buried him in the monastery "St. Panteleimon" in Ohrid, which he had established. He was canonized in X c. and joined the pantheon of the Bulgarian saints.") scholar, writer, and apostle to the Slavs. He was one of the most prominent disciples of Cyril and Methodius and is often associated with the creation of the Glagolitic and Cyrillic scripts, especially their popularisation among Christianised Slavs. He was the founder of the Ohrid Literary School and is regarded as a patron of education and language by some Slavic people. He is considered to be the first bishop of the Bulgarian Orthodox Church, (Note: "...the First Bishop of the Bulgarian language".) one of the Seven Apostles of Bulgarian Orthodox Church since the 10th century, and one of the premier saints of modern Bulgaria. The mission of Clement was the crucial factor which transformed the Slavs in then Kutmichevitsa (present-day Macedonia) (Note: In the Byzantine Empire, a province or theme named Macedonia was formed out of the original theme of Thrace, whose capital was Adrianople in today's Turkey. The modern nation of Macedonia was ruled by the First Bulgarian Empire during the 9th and the 10th century and was incorporated into the Byzantine Empire in 1018 as part of the theme of Bulgaria.) into Bulgarians. Clement is also the patron saint of North Macedonia, the city of Ohrid and the Macedonian Orthodox Church.

== Life ==
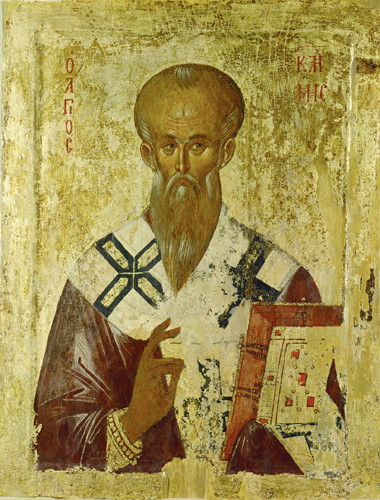
Icon of Saint Clement, located in the Mother of God Perybleptos church, Ohrid

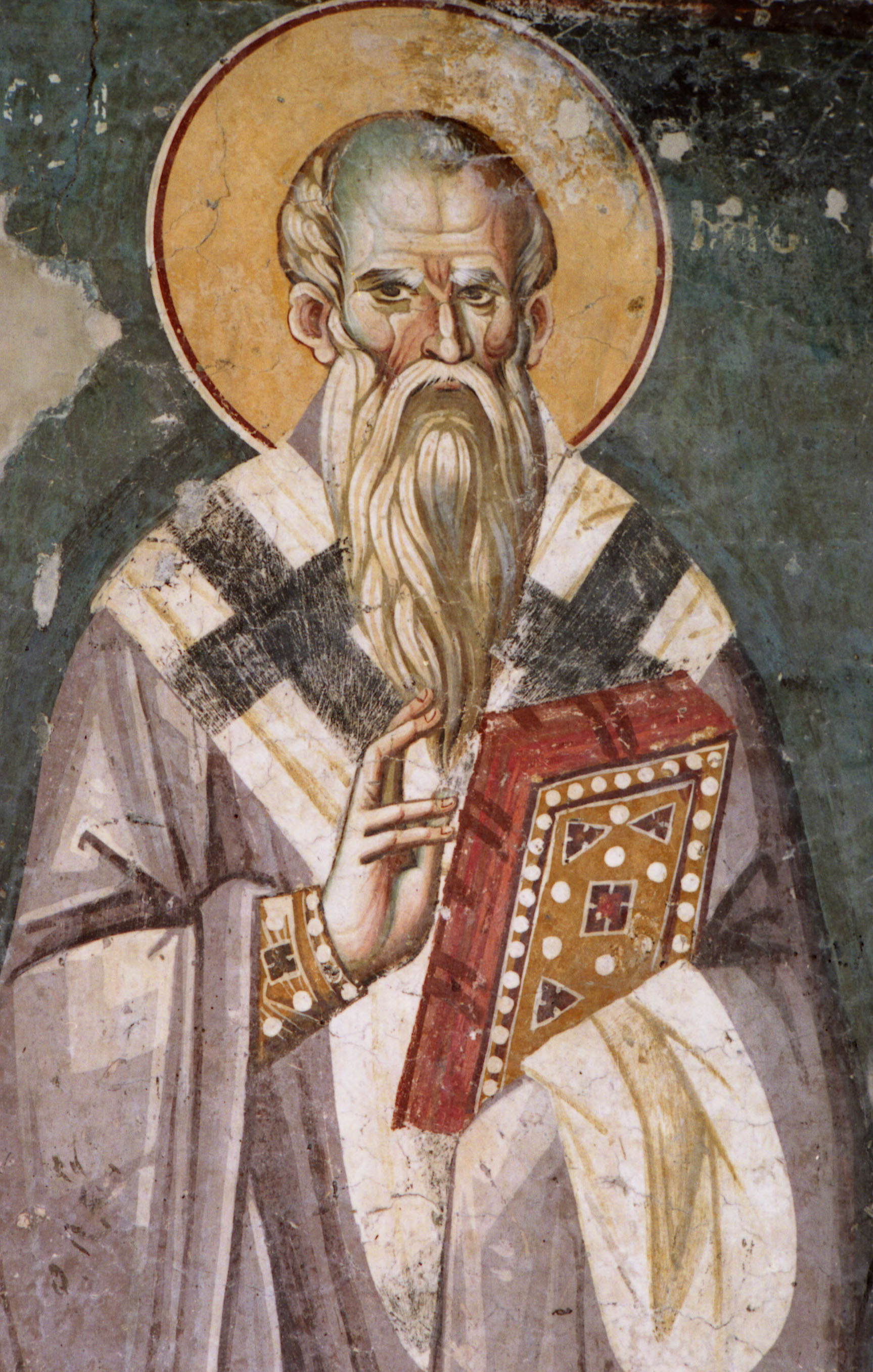
Fresco of Saint Clement, located in the Mother of God Perybleptos church, Ohrid

The exact date of his birth is unknown. Most probably, he joined Methodius as a young man following him later to the monastery on Mysian Olympus. According to his hagiography by Theophylact of Ohrid, Clement knew the life of Methodius like no other. That is why most scholars think he was born in the Byzantine Empire in the territory where Methodius served during his political career, i.e., that he was a Slav from Southern Macedonia. This compels some researchers to designate the area of Thessaloniki as the possible place of birth of Clement. According to others, the area of Southern Macedonia, including the northern approach to Thessaloniki, where he may have been born, was then part of the First Bulgarian Empire. Most of Macedonia became part of Bulgaria between 830 and 840, i.e., when Clement was born. The Short Life of St. Clement by Theophylact of Ohrid testifies to his Slavic origin, calling him "the first bishop in the Bulgarian language," while The Ohrid Legend written by Demetrios Chomatenos describes him as one of the European Moesians, commonly known as Bulgarians. (Note: "This great father of ours and light of Bulgaria was by origin of the European Moesians whom the people commonly known as Bulgarians…") Because of that, some scholars label him a Bulgarian Slav, while Dimitri Obolensky calls Clement a Slav inhabitant of the Kingdom of Bulgaria. A fringe view on his origin postulates that Clement was born in Great Moravia. This view is based on the lexicographical analysis of Clement's works.

Clement participated in the mission of Cyril and Methodius to Great Moravia. In 867 or 868 he became a priest in Rome, ordained along with two other disciples of Cyril and Methodius, Gorazd and Naum, by bishops Formosus and Gauderic. After the death of Cyril, Clement accompanied Methodius on his journey from Rome to Pannonia and Great Moravia. After the death of Methodius himself in 885, Clement headed the struggle against the German clergy in Great Moravia along with Gorazd. After spending some time in jail, he was expelled from Great Moravia and in 885 or 886 reached Belgrade, then within the borders of Bulgaria, together with Naum of Preslav, Angelarius and possibly also Gorazd (according to other sources, Gorazd was already dead by that time). Angelarius died soon after arrival, but Clement and Naum were afterwards sent to the Bulgarian capital of Pliska, where they were commissioned by Boris I to instruct the future clergy of the state in the Slavonic language. Eventually they were commissioned to establish two theological schools — the Ohrid Literary School in Ohrid and the Preslav Literary School in Preslav. The Preslav Literary School had been originally established in Pliska, but was moved to Preslav in 893. After the adoption of Christianity in 865, religious ceremonies in Bulgaria were conducted in Greek by clergy sent from the Byzantine Empire. Fearing growing Byzantine influence and weakening of the state, Boris viewed the adoption of the Old Slavonic language as a way to preserve the political independence and stability of Bulgaria.

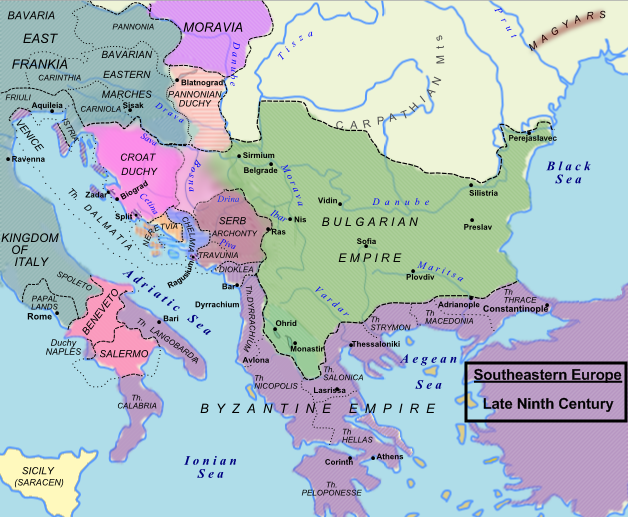
Southeastern Europe in the late 9th century.

According to his hagiography by Theophylact of Ohrid, while Naum stayed in Pliska working on the foundation of the Pliska Literary School, Clement was commissioned by Boris I to organise the teaching of theology to future clergymen in Old Church Slavonic in the southwestern part of the Bulgarian Empire, in the region then known as Kutmichevitsa, where he founded the Ohrid Literary School in Ohrid. For a period of seven years (between 886 and 893) Clement taught some 3,500 disciples in the Slavonic language and the Glagolitic alphabet. At that time, Clement translated Christian literature into Old Church Slavonic, and in this way, he and his co-workers laid the foundations of the Bulgarian Orthodox Church.

In 893 he was ordained archbishop of Drembica, Velika (bishopric). Upon his death in 916 he was buried in his monastery, Saint Panteleimon, in Ohrid. Soon after he was canonized as a saint by the Bulgarian Orthodox Church.

The development of Old Church Slavonic literacy had the effect of preventing the assimilation of the South Slavs into neighbouring Byzantine culture, which promoted the formation of a distinct Bulgarian identity in the Empire. During the first quarter of the 10th century, the ethnonym “Bulgarians” was adopted by the Slavic tribes in most of Macedonia, while their names were abandoned. (Note: "Early in the tenth century, the name 'Bulgarians', in its wider meaning, was widespread and used throughout the country, while the names of the separate Slav tribes were abandoned. An interesting instance of the use of the name 'Bulgarians' is found in the so-called 'Expanded Biography of Clement of Ochrida'... It, therefore, mirrors developments and the situation in the south-western Bulgarian territories (Macedonia) in the beginning of the tenth century. It is this disciple of Clement, namely, who wrote in the tenth century, that called himself and his compatriots by the name 'Bulgarians'. This is obvious from a text in the biography, which glorifies Clement that he gave everything, related to the church 'to us, the Bulgarians'. This means that the name 'Bulgarians' was already firmly established among the population in the south-western Bulgarian territories early in the tenth century.") Clement's life's work played a significant role in this transformation.

== Legacy ==
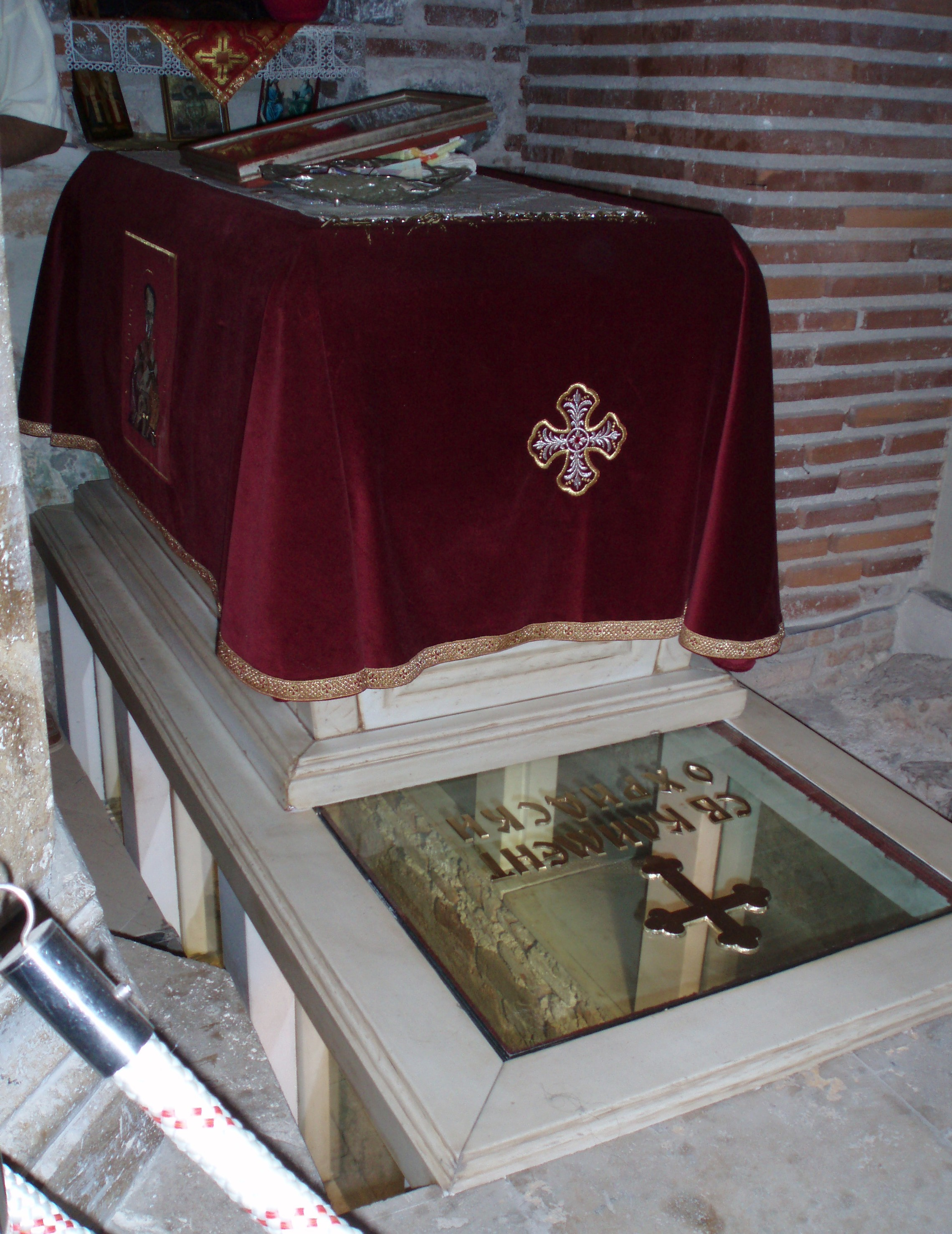
Tomb of Saint Clement within the Church of Sts. Clement and Panteleimon, Ohrid, North Macedonia.

Clement of Ohrid was one of the most prolific and important writers in Old Church Slavonic. He is credited with the Panonic Hagiography of Saint Cyril and Saint Methodius. Clement also translated the Flower Triode containing church songs sung from Easter to Pentecost and is believed to be the author of the Holy Service and the Life of St. Clement of Rome, as well as of the oldest service dedicated to Saint Cyril and Saint Methodius. The invention of the Cyrillic alphabet is also usually ascribed to him although the alphabet is most likely to have been developed at the Preslav Literary School at the beginning of the 10th century (see Cyrillic script).

Medieval frescoes of Clement exist throughout the modern-day territories of North Macedonia, Serbia and northern Greece, with the vast majority being located in North Macedonia. The Church of St. Clement of Ohrid is located in Skopje and is the largest cathedral of the Macedonian Orthodox Church.

The first modern Bulgarian university, Sofia University, was named after Clement upon its foundation in 1888. The Macedonian National and University Library, founded on November 23, 1944, also bears his name. The University in Bitola, established in 1979, is named after Clement, as well as the Bulgarian scientific base, St. Kliment Ohridski on Livingston Island in the South Shetland Islands of Antarctica.

In November 2008, the Macedonian Orthodox Church donated part of Clement's relics to the Bulgarian Orthodox Church as a sign of good will.

In May 2018 was announced that in the ruins of a Ravna Monastery, near the village of Ravna in Provadiya Municipality, the signature of Clement was identified on a stone plate with a large amount of graffiti on it. The signature is dated as of April 24, 889. The finding gives reason to assume that the disciples of Cyril and Methodius were settled there at one stage, after being expelled from the Great Moravia and their reception in Bulgaria.

== See also ==
- Chernorizets Hrabar

== Sources ==
- Gautier, Paul (1964). "Clément d'Ohrid, évèque de Dragvista". Revue des études byzantines. 22: 199–214.
- Iliev, Ilia G. (1995). "The Long Life of Saint Clement of Ohrid: A Critical Edition" (PDF). Byzantinobulgarica. 9: 62–120.
- Ivanič, Peter (2018). "The Issue of the Origin of Saint Clement of Ohrid and Saint Naum of Ohrid in Slovak and Czech Historiography" (PDF). European Journal of Science and Theology. 14 (1): 135–144. Archived from the original on 2023-06-28.
- Мучай, Скендер; Джуери, Суеля; Ристани, Ирклид; Пентковский, Алексей М. (2014). "Средневековые церкви в долине Шушицы (Южная Албания) и славянская епископия свт. Климента Охридского" [Medieval Churches in Shushica Valley (South Albania) and the Slavonic Bishopric of St. Clement of Ohrid] (PDF). Slověne: International Journal of Slavic Studies. 3 (1): 5–42. Archived from the original on 2023-06-28.
- Popović, Mihailo St. (2016). "Saint Clement of Ohrid: His Life and Aftermath Between Sofia and Skopje". Споменица др Тибора Живковића. Београд: Историјски институт. pp. 77–90.
