= Devol (Albania) =

Ancient town in Albania

Devol (Albanian: Devoll, Devolli; Bulgarian: Девол; Greek: Δεάβολις) also Deabolis or Diabolis, was a medieval fortress and bishopric in western Macedonia, located south of Lake Ohrid in what is today the south-eastern corner of Albania (Devoll municipality). Its precise location is unknown today, but it is thought to have been located by the river of the same name (today Devoll River), and on the Roman Via Egnatia road. It is first mentioned in historical sources in John Skylitzes' account of the Byzantine-Bulgarian Wars under Emperor Basil II, whose general Eustathios Daphnomeles is said to have subdued some of the last Bulgarian resisting forces concentrated in Deabolis in 1018. The place is also mentioned in a 1019 charter granted by Basil to the Bulgarian church, as a kastron (castle) under the jurisdiction of the bishop of Kastoria.

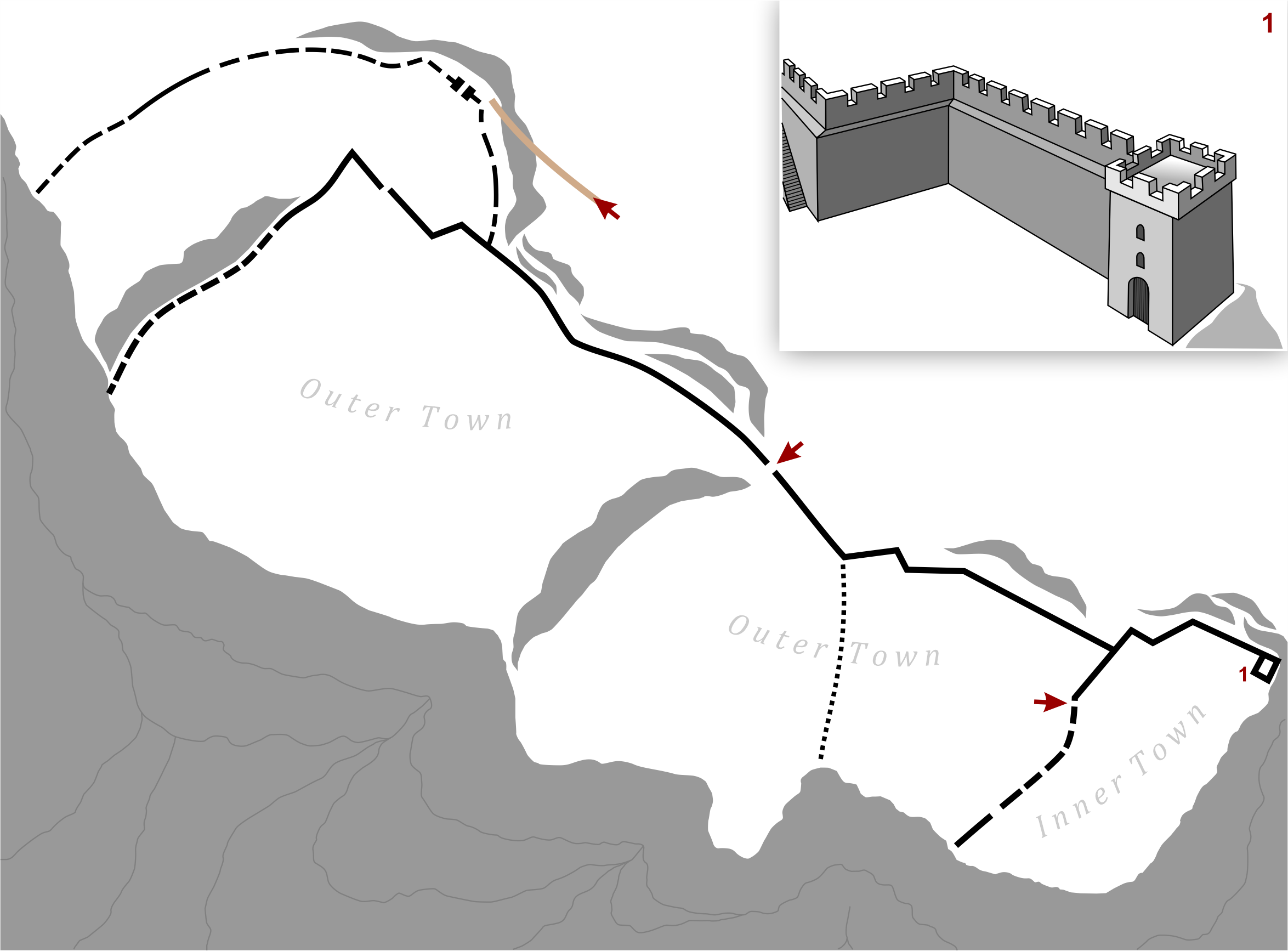
Plan of the medieval fortress Devol

It is not precisely known when Deabolis became a bishopric. Saint Clement of Ohrid (ca. 840–916), an eminent medieval Bulgarian writer, is supposed to have been its bishop around 900, according to the saint's vita written by Theophylact of Ohrid some 200 years later; however, the first independent contemporary documents confirming its status as a bishopric are of a later date.

Deabolis/Devol was the site of the Treaty of Devol between Bohemond I of Antioch and Byzantine Emperor Alexios I Komnenos in 1108. It was reconquered by the Bulgarian Empire in the beginning of the 13th century. Byzantine control was restored in 1259 when Michael Palaiologos besieged the city using helepolis siege engines. The fortress continued to play an important role until the 14th century. Its site became forgotten in modern times. It has been tentatively identified with the site of a modern Albanian village called Zvezdë (located at 40°43′N 020°51′E), a conjecture already proposed by the 19th century British traveller William Martin Leake in 1835.

The place Deabolis/Devol on the Devoll river should not be confused with a different medieval fortress likewise called Deabolis, or Devolgrad, situated further east in today's Macedonia, near Kavadarci.
