= List of undefeated military leaders =

This is a chronological list of notable conquerors, military leaders, generals and admirals from worldwide with undefeated or near-undefeated reputation during their career. This list is sorted by portrait, commander, era, allegiance and notes on their activity. This list also includes different continents for each leader.

== Europe ==
Portrait	Commander	Era	Allegiance	Notes
	Alexander the Great	4th century BC	Macedonian Empire	Known for conquering most of the known world during his era, and has acquired a reputation for never losing a battle.
	Scipio Africanus	3rd century BC	Roman Republic	Roman general and statesman who was one of the main architects of Rome's victory against Carthage in the Second Punic War. Often regarded as one of the greatest military commanders and strategists of all time, his crowning achievement was the defeat of Hannibal at the Battle of Zama in 202 BC, which earned him the honorific epithet Africanus ("the African").
	Marcus Vipsanius Agrippa	1st century BC	Roman Republic	Marcus Vipsanius Agrippa was a Roman general and statesman who was a close friend, son-in-law and lieutenant to the Roman emperor Augustus. Agrippa is well known for his important military victories, notably the Battle of Actium in 31 BC against the forces of Marcus Antonius and Cleopatra. Agrippa masterminded major campaigns and never lost a battle.
	Nero Claudius Drusus	1st century BC	Roman Empire	Roman general who launched the first major campaigns across the Rhine and conquered Germanic tribes—including the Batavi, Frisii, Sicambri, and Cherusci—advancing Roman control to the Elbe without suffering a single defeat.
	Germanicus	1st century BC-1st century	Roman Empire	Roman general and politician who led successful campaigns in Pannonia, Dalmatia, and Germania. Defeated Arminius at the Battle of Idistaviso (16 AD) and the Battle of the Angrivarian Wall (16 AD). Maintained an unbroken record of tactical victories until his recall and death in Antioch.
	Narses	5th–6th centuries	Byzantine Empire	Roman general and statesman renowned for his critical role in Emperor Justinian I's military campaigns. He rose during the Nika riots in 532 till 539 AD. He commanded the Byzantines in the campaigns in the Balkan (545–551), Appointed supreme commander of Italy in 551 AD, Narses achieved his famous triple victories at Taginae (552), Mons Lactarius (552), and Volturnus (554). In 567, he was recalled from Italy by Justin II at the age of ninty.
	El Cid	11th century	Lordship of Valencia	Spanish national hero, Valencian prince and a Castilian knight with an undefeated reputation in battle.
	Roger of Lauria	13th–14th centuries	Kingdom of Sicily	Roger of Lauria was a Calabrian knight in service of the Aragonese as admiral of the Sicilian navy. His naval career focused the War of the Sicilian Vespers. During this course of conflicts, he never lost a single marine time engagement. He had six major victories–including the Battle of Malta (1283), the Battle of the Gulf of Naples (1284) the Battle of Les Formigues (1285), the Battle of the Counts (1287), the Battle of Capo d'Orlando (1299), and the Battle of Ponza (1300). He suffered one defeat in land during the summer of 1297.
	Jan Žižka	15th century	Taborites (1419–1423); Orebites (1423–1424)	Czech national hero and a major participant in the Hussite Wars, who remained militarily undefeated throughout his career.
	Pál Kinizsi	15th century	Kingdom of Hungary	Hungarian national hero. He was a general of the famed Black Army of the Kingdom of Hungary during the reign of King Matthias Corvinus. He is famous for his victory over the Ottomans at the Battle of Breadfield in 1479. He is reputed to have never lost a battle.
	Edward IV	15th century	House of York; Kingdom of England	Yorkist king of England who won the battles of Mortimer's Cross, Towton, Barnet and Tewkesbury, and is generally regarded as having remained undefeated in battle as a commander.
	Ivan Sirko	17th century	Zaporozhian Sich	The legendary Kosh Otaman of the Zaporozhian Sich. During his career, Sirko took part in 55 Cossack campaigns and built a reputation for himself of never losing a battle.
	John Churchill	17th–18th century	Kingdom of England; Kingdom of Great Britain	British General and statesman of the late 17th and early 18th centuries with an undefeated status in both battle and siege.
	Fyodor Ushakov	18th–19th century	Russian Empire	Prominent 18th and early-19th century Russian admiral with an undefeated reputation at sea regarding naval warfare.
	Alexander Suvorov	18th century	Russian Empire	Prominent 18th-century Russian general known for his legendary military career and undefeated status in battle.
	Paul von Lettow-Vorbeck	20th century	German Empire	Reputation as the only German general during World War I to remain undefeated while fighting numerically superior forces.

== Asia ==
Portrait	Commander	Era	Allegiance	Notes
	Bai Qi	3rd century BC	Qin State	Bai Qi became known for his brutal methods of warfare and for his undefeated reputation during his 40-year career as a general.
	Khalid ibn al-Walid	7th century	Quraysh (625–627/629); Muhammad (627/629–632); Rashidun Caliphate (632–638)	7th century Arab commander and an important figure in early Islamic history. He successfully fought in over 41 military engagements, masterminded the rapid conquest of both the Byzantine Levant and Sasanian Iraq. He remained undefeated throughout his entire career.
	Mahmud of Ghazni	11th century	Ghaznavid Empire	The 11th-century Sultan of the Ghaznavid Empire led various campaigns in Persia, Central Asia, and the Indian subcontinent over the course of four decades, earning an undefeated reputation in battle.
	Muqali	12th–13th century	Mongol Empire	Mongol General of the late 12th and early 13th centuries in the service of Genghis Khan who was known for his undefeated record in Jin China despite limited resources.
	Alauddin Khalji	13th-14th century	Khalji dynasty	Second Sultan of the Khalji dynasty of Delhi, maintained an unbroken military record throughout his reign. He successfully defended Northern India from multiple large-scale Chagatai Mongol invasions and directed the expansion of the Delhi Sultanate across Rajasthan, Malwa, Gujarat, and deep into southern India without suffering a single defeat on the battlefield.
	Timur	14–15th century	Timurid Empire	Turco-Mongol ruler and founder of the Timurid Empire during the 14th and early 15th century. Regarded as an undefeated and cruel conqueror.
	Ahmad Shah I	15th century	Gujarat Sultanate	Sultan Ahmad Shah I restlessly fought against the Bahmani Kingdom, Malwa Sultanate and Kingdom of Mewar. He secured authority over regional Rajput kingdoms and Khandesh. He remained undefeated throughout thirty years of his reign.
	Krishnadevaraya	15th-16th centuries	Vijayanagara Empire	Ruler of the Vijayanagara Empire at its military and cultural zenith. Known by the title Mooru Rayara Ganda ("Lord of Three Kings"), he systematically crushed the invading Deccan Sultanates (Bijapur, Golconda, and the Bahmani Sultanate), decisively triumphed over the Gajapati Empire of Odisha through brilliant siegecraft, and successfully annexed the strategic Raichur Doab—never suffering a single strategic defeat in his numerous campaigns.
	Özdemiroğlu Osman Paşa	16th century	Ottoman Empire	Ottoman general noted for his undefeated reputation in field campaigns against the Safavids; no recorded battlefield defeat before his death.
	Selim the Grim	16th century	Ottoman Empire	Ottoman sultan and military commander who achieved decisive victories at Chaldiran, Marj Dabiq, and Ridaniya; no recorded battlefield defeat during his reign.
	Yi Sun-sin	16th century	Joseon	16th-century Korean admiral and military general. Participated in at least 23 naval battles against numerically superior enemy forces during the Imjin War, without losing any battles.

== Africa ==
Portrait	Commander	Era	Allegiance	Notes
	Ahmose I	16th century BC	18th Dynasty	Egyptian pharaoh who founded the New Kingdom of Egypt. Expelled the Hyksos after the Siege of Avaris, destroyed their stronghold at Sharuhen, and led successful campaigns into Nubia and the Levant. Maintained an unbroken military record.
	Thutmose III	15th century BC	Egyptian Empire	During his reign over ancient Egypt, Thutmose III expended the Empire's borders and later earned the nickname "Napoleon of Egypt" due to his undefeated status in military campaigns.

== North America ==
Portrait	Commander	Era	Allegiance	Notes
	George Henry Thomas	19th century	United States (Union)	Thomas earned a reputation as the only undefeated Union general during the American Civil War.

== Bibliography ==
- Cawthorne, Nigel (2012). Victory: 100 Great Military Commanders. Arcturus Publishing. ISBN 978-1-84858-830-1.
- Akram, A. I. (2009). Sword of Allah: Khalid Bin Al-Waleed, His Life and Campaigns. Adam Publishers & Distributors. ISBN 978-81-7435-521-8.
- Khan, Bilal Sarfraz (12 June 2012). General Khalid Bin Waleed: Understanding the 7th Century Campaign against Sassanid Persian Empire from the Perspective of Operational Art (Report). Fort Leavenworth, Kansas: United States Army Command and General Staff College.
- Commissariat, M. S. (1938). A History of Gujarat. Vol. I. Ahmadabad: Longmans Green & Co. Ltd.
- Holmes, Richard (2012-06-21). Marlborough: Britain’s Greatest General (Text Only). HarperCollins Publishers. ISBN 978-0-00-738032-9.
