= Peter III of Aragon =

King of Aragon and Valencia (1276–85); King of Sicily (1282–85)

Peter III
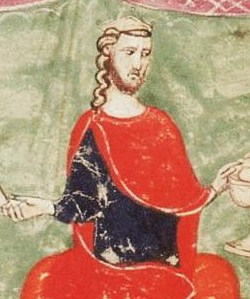
- Detail from the Nuova Cronica

King of Aragon and Valencia Count of Barcelona
- Reign: 27 July 1276 – November 1285
- Predecessor: James I
- Successor: Alfonso III

King of Sicily
- Reign: 4 September 1282 – November 1285
- Predecessor: Charles I
- Successor: James I
- Co-ruler: Constance II
- Born: c. 1239; Valencia, Aragon
- Died: 11 November 1285 (aged 45–46); Vilafranca del Penedès, Catalonia, Aragon
- Burial: Santes Creus
- Spouse: Constance II of Sicily (m. 1262)
- Issue more...: Alfonso III, King of Aragon; James II, King of Aragon; Elizabeth, Queen of Portugal; Frederick III, King of Sicily; Yolande, Duchess of Calabria
- House: Barcelona
- Father: James I of Aragon
- Mother: Violant of Hungary

Peter III of Aragon (In Aragonese, Pero; in Catalan, Pere; in Italian, Pietro; c. 1239 – 11 November 1285) was King of Aragon, King of Valencia (as Peter I), and Count of Barcelona (as Peter II) from 1276 to his death. At the invitation of some rebels, he conquered the Kingdom of Sicily and became King of Sicily (as Peter I) in 1282, pressing the claim of his wife, Constance II of Sicily, uniting the kingdom to the crown.

== Youth and succession ==
Peter was the eldest son of James I of Aragon and his second wife Violant of Hungary. On 13 June 1262, Peter married Constance II of Sicily, daughter and heiress of Manfred of Sicily. During his youth and early adulthood, Peter gained a great deal of military experience in his father's wars of the Reconquista against the Moors.

In June 1275, Peter besieged, captured, and executed his rebellious half-brother Fernando Sánchez de Castro at Pomar de Cinca.

On his father's death in 1276, the lands of the Crown of Aragon were divided amongst his two sons. The Kingdom of Aragon, the Kingdom of Valencia and the Principality of Catalonia went to Peter III as being the eldest son; while the Kingdom of Majorca and the Catalan counties beyond the Pyrenees went to the second son, who became James II of Majorca.

Peter and Constance were crowned in Zaragoza in November 1276 by the archbishop of Tarragona.

== Early rebellions ==
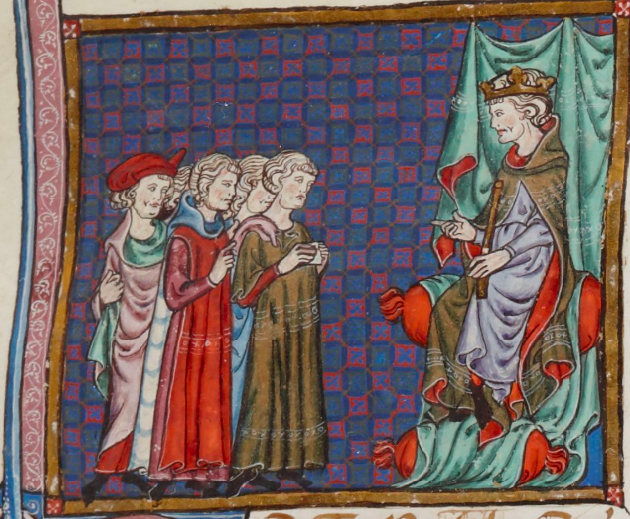
Audience of Peter III of Aragon; medieval miniature from the Usatici et Constitutiones Cataloniae (between c. 1315–1325).

Peter's first act as king was to complete the pacification of his Valencian territory, an action which had been underway before his father's death.

However, a revolt soon broke out in the Principality of Catalonia, led by the viscount of Cardona and abetted by Roger-Bernard III of Foix, Arnold Roger I of Pallars Sobirà, and Ermengol X of Urgell. The rebels had developed a hatred for Peter as a result of the severity of his dealings with them during the reign of his father. Now they opposed him for not summoning the General Court of Catalonia (the parliament), and confirming its privileges after his ascension to the throne.

At the same time, a succession crisis continued in the County of Urgell. When Àlvar of Urgell died in 1268, the families of his two wives, Constance, a daughter of Pere de Montcada of Bearn, and Cecilia, a daughter of Roger-Bernard II of Foix, began a long fight over the inheritance of his county. Meanwhile, a good portion of the county had been repossessed by Peter's father, James I, and was thus inherited by Peter in 1276. In 1278, Ermengol X, Àlvar's eldest son, succeeded in recovering most of his lost patrimony and came to an agreement with Peter whereby he recognised the latter as his suzerain.

In 1280, Peter defeated the stewing rebellion led by Roger-Bernard III after besieging the rebels in Balaguer for a month. Most of the rebel leaders were imprisoned in Lleida until 1281, while Roger-Bernard was imprisoned until 1284.

== Wars abroad ==
=== Tunisia ===
When Muhammad I al-Mustansir, the Hafsid Emir of Tunisia who had put himself under James I of Aragon, died in 1277, Tunisia threw off the yoke of Aragonese suzerainty. Peter first sent an expedition to Tunis in 1280 under Conrad de Llansa designed to re-establish his suzerainty. In 1281, he himself prepared to lead a fleet of 140 ships with 15,000 men to invade Tunisia on behalf of the governor of Constantine. The fleet landed at Alcoyll in 1282. It was these Aragonese troops that received a Sicilian embassy after the Vespers of 30 March asking Peter to take their throne from Charles I of Anjou.

=== War of the Sicilian Vespers ===
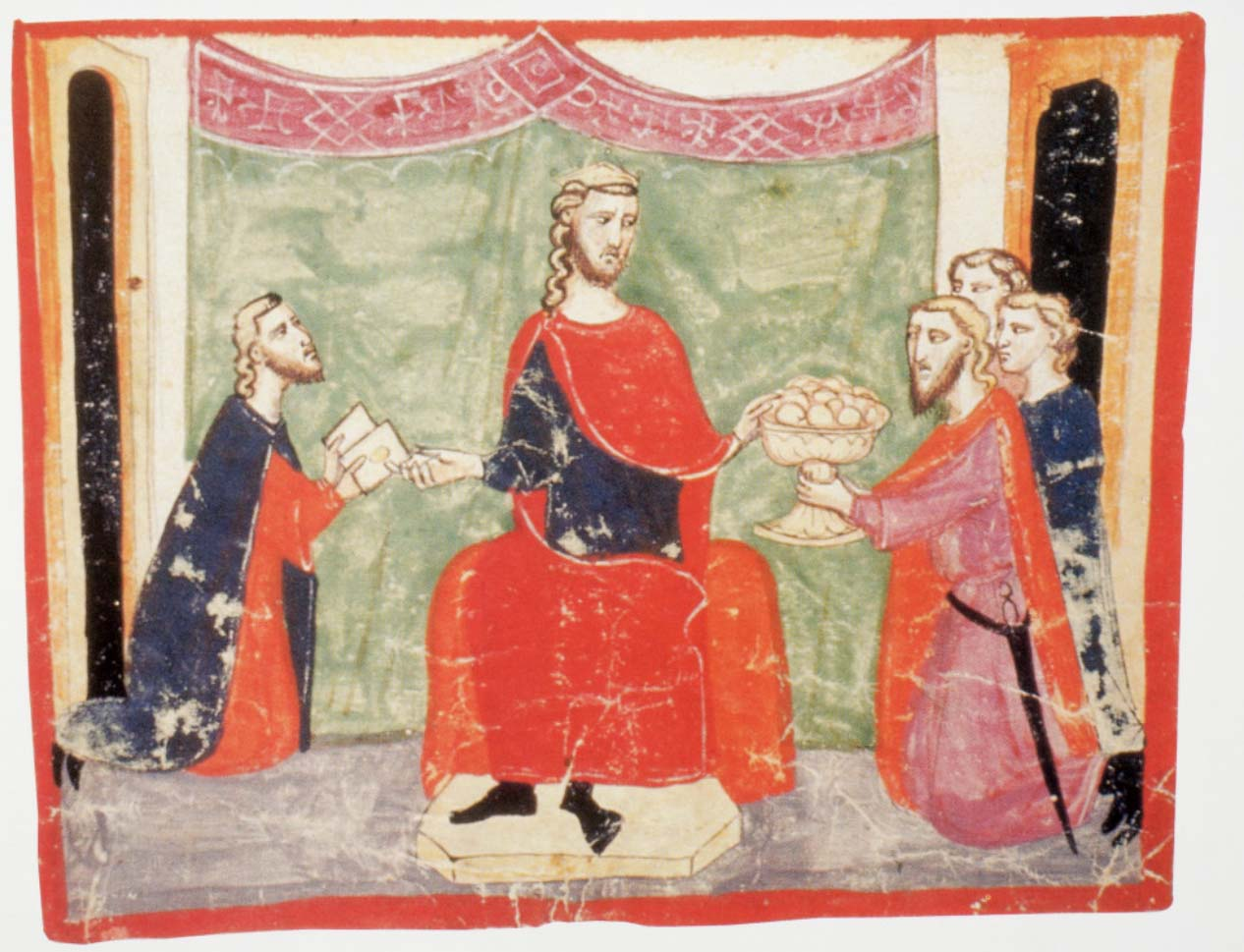
Peter III gives audience to ambassadors of Frederick II, Holy Roman Emperor and Michael VIII Palaiologos, demanding Peter to intervene in the war against Charles I of Anjou. Nuova Cronica.

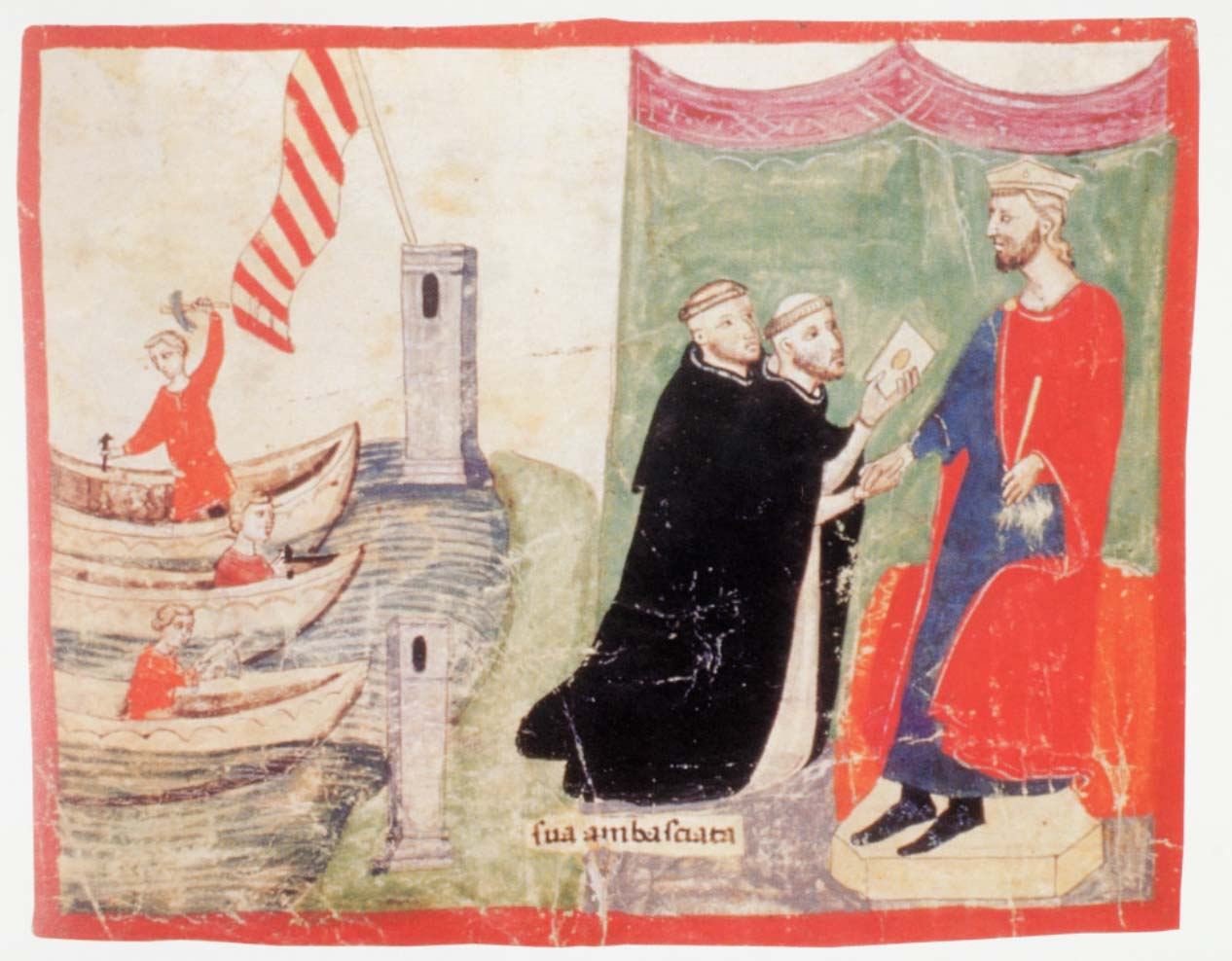
Peter III preparing his trip to Sicily. The king receives the visit of two Dominican friars, envoyes of Pope Martin IV trying to convince him not to sail to Sicily. Nuova Cronica.

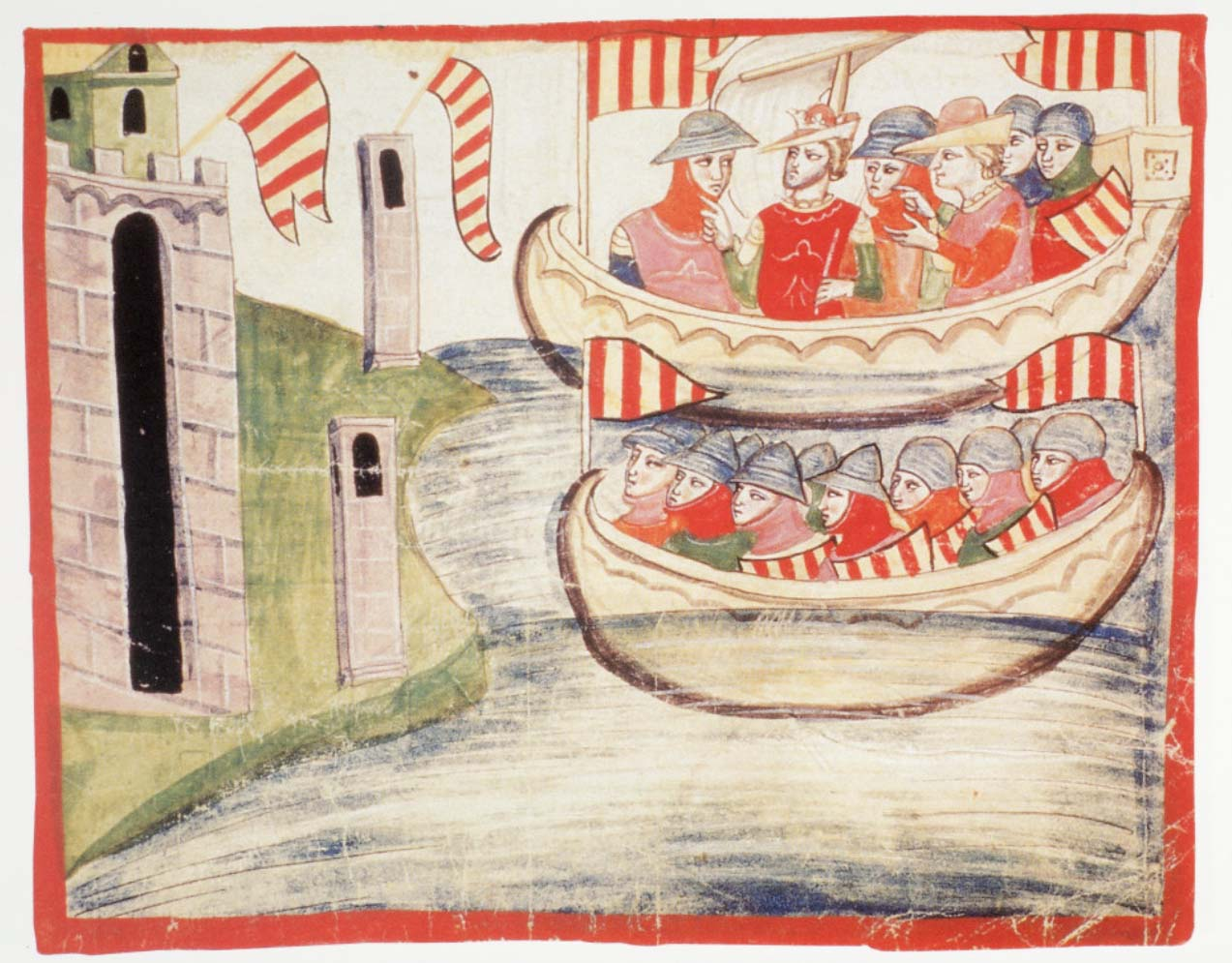
Peter III's fleet landing at Trapani. The king is depicted directing the landing, next to his wife Constance. Nuova Cronica.

In 1266, Charles I of Naples, with the approval of Pope Clement IV, invaded the Kingdom of Sicily, governed by the house of Hohenstaufen, which was the house of Peter's wife, Constance II of Sicily, daughter of Manfred of Sicily and rightful heir to the throne of Sicily after the deaths of her father and cousin Conradin fighting against Charles's invading forces. This made Peter the heir of Manfred of Sicily in right of his wife.

The Italian physician John of Procida acted on behalf of Peter in Sicily. John had fled to Aragon after Charles' success at the Battle of Tagliacozzo. John travelled to Sicily to stir up the discontents in favour of Peter and thence to Constantinople to procure the support of Michael VIII Palaiologos. Michael refused to aid the Aragonese king without papal approval, and so John voyaged to Rome and there gained the consent of Pope Nicholas III, who feared the ascent of Charles in the Mezzogiorno. John then returned to Barcelona but the Pope died, to be replaced by Pope Martin IV, a Frenchman and a staunch ally of Charles and the Anjou dynasty. This set the stage for the upcoming conflict.

Constance thus claimed to her father's throne, supported by her husband, but the claim was fruitless, as Charles was supported by the Papacy and his power remained stronger. The election of a new Pope Nicholas III in 1277 gave the King of Aragon a glimpse of hope, but Nicholas died in 1280 and a pro-French Pope Martin IV dissipated hopes.

Peter nevertheless had begun making strategic alliances with his neighbouring monarchs. Peter made his brother James II of Majorca sign the treaty of Perpignan in 1279, in which he recognized the Kingdom of Majorca as a feudal kingdom of Peter III (making the Crown of Aragon an indissoluble unity). Peter pressed his advantage and by February 1283 had taken most of the Calabrian coastline. Charles, perhaps feeling desperate, sent letters to Peter demanding they resolve the conflict by personal combat. Peter accepted and Charles returned to France to arrange the duel. Both kings chose six knights to settle on places and dates, and a duel was scheduled for 1 June at Bordeaux. A hundred knights would accompany each side and Edward I of England would adjudge the contest; the English king, heeding the pope, however, refused to take part. Peter left John of Procida in charge of Sicily and returned via his own kingdom to Bordeaux, which he entered in disguise to evade a suspected French ambush. Needless to say, no combat ever took place and Peter returned to find a very turbulent Aragon.

He also had a long-lasting friendly relationship with the Kingdom of Castile, establishing a strong alliance between realms by signing the treaties of Campillo and Ágreda in 1281 with Alfonso X of Castile and infant Sancho.

With the Kingdom of Portugal, Peter established a marital alliance by which his eldest daughter Elizabeth of Aragon married Denis I of Portugal. Peter also made alliance with the Kingdom of England, engaging his heir Alfonso III with Eleanor of England, daughter of Edward I of England. Despite all these alliances, Peter kept his bad relationship with the Kingdom of France.

On 30 March 1282 there was a popular uprising in the Kingdom of Sicily called the Sicilian Vespers, against the government of Charles I of Anjou. The noble sicilian rebels asked for Peter for help and offered him the crown as they considered his wife Constance their rightful Queen, and after receiving an embassy from the people of Palermo at Alcoy, Peter landed at Trapani on 30 August 1282. He was proclaimed King in Palermo on 4 September. Charles was forced to flee across the Straits of Messina and be content with his Kingdom of Naples. Pope Martin IV excommunicated both Peter and Michael VIII Palaiologos for providing Peter with 60,000 gold pieces to invade Sicily.

Catalan ground troops were commanded by Guillem Galceran de Cartellà, and were formed by the famous and feared almogavars, crossbowmen, and lancers. Peter's powerful fleet was commanded by Roger of Lauria, and constantly repelled Angevin attacks to the island. Roger de Lauria defeated the French forces at the Battle of Malta, and at the Gulf of Naples in 1284, where Charles of Salerno, son of Charles I, was made prisoner.

The conquest of Sicily was financed by Jewish contributions and taxes charged to the aljamas. The infant Alfonso demanded them an allowance of 200,000 sous in 1282. The aljamas from the Kingdom of Valencia gave 25,000 sous, the Aragonese 75,000 and 100,000 were charged to the Catalan aljamas. The Kingdom of Sicily was to be a tenaciously pursued inheritance for the Aragonese royal house and its heirs for the next five centuries.

== Later domestic unrest ==
Peter was dealing with domestic unrest at the time when the French were preparing an invasion of Aragon. He took Albarracín from the rebellious noble Juan Núñez de Lara, he renewed the alliance with Sancho IV of Castile, and he attacked Tudela in an attempt to prevent Philip I of Navarre from invading on that front. Peter held meetings of the cortes at Tarragona and Zaragoza in 1283. He was forced to grant the Privilegio General to the newly formed Union of Aragon.

Also in 1283, Peter's brother James II of Majorca joined the French and recognised their suzerainty over Montpellier. This gave the French free passage into Catalonia through Roussillon as well as access to the Balearic Islands. In October, Peter began preparing the defences of Catalonia. In 1284, Pope Martin IV granted the Kingdom of Aragon to Charles, Count of Valois, another son of the French king and great-nephew of Charles I of Anjou. Papal sanction was given to a war to conquer Aragon on behalf of Charles of Valois.

== Aragonese Crusade ==
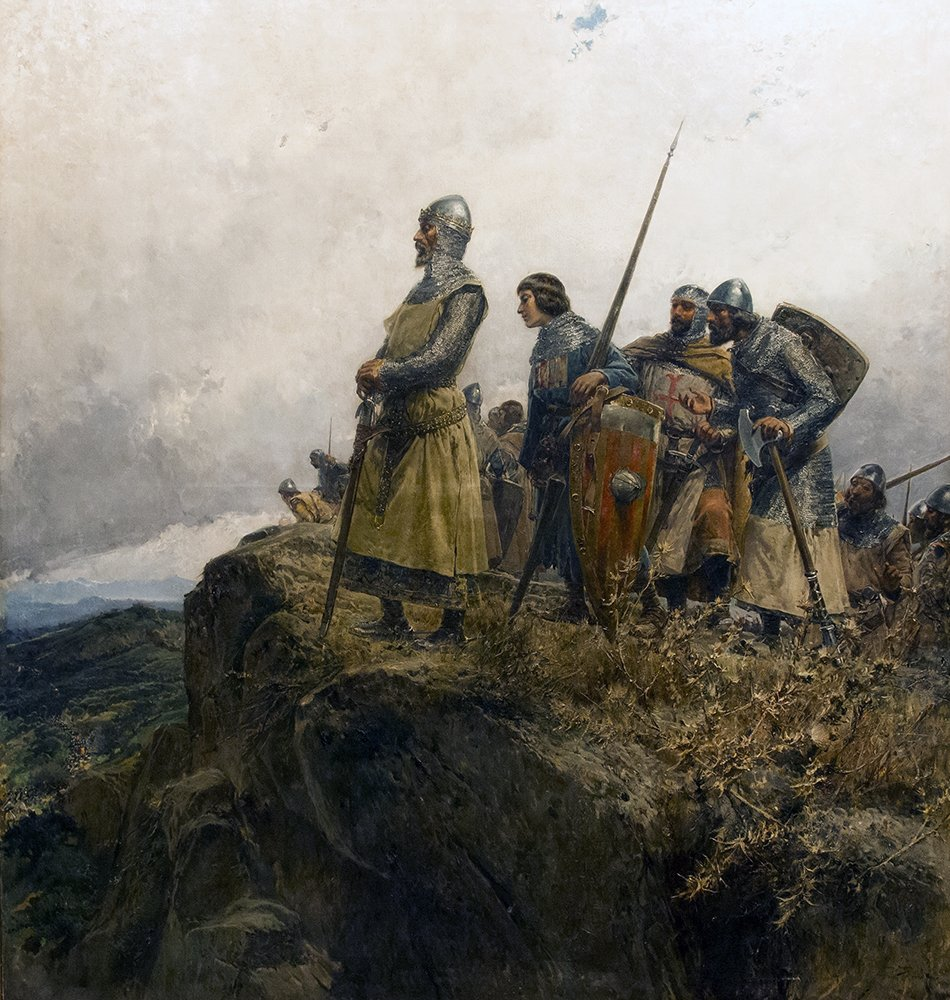
Peter III the Great at Col de Panissars, painting by Mariano Barbasán (1891), Diputación Provincial de Zaragoza, Zaragoza

In 1284, the first French armies under Philip and Charles entered Roussillon. They included 16,000 cavalry, 17,000 crossbowmen, and 100,000 infantry, along with 100 ships in south French ports. Though the French had James's support, the local populace rose against them. The city of Elne was valiantly defended by the so-called "bastard of Roussillon", the illegitimate son of Nuño Sánchez, late count of Roussillon. Eventually he was overcome and the cathedral was burnt; the royal forces progressed.

In 1285, Philip entrenched himself before Girona in an attempt to besiege it. The resistance was strong, but the city was taken. Charles was crowned there, but without an actual crown. The French soon experienced a reversal, however, at the hands of Roger de Lauria, back from the Italian theatre of the drawn-out conflict. The French fleet was defeated and destroyed at the Battle of Les Formigues on 4 September 1285. In addition, the French camp was hit hard by an epidemic of dysentery.

The King of France himself was afflicted. The King of Navarre, the heir apparent to the French throne, opened negotiations with Peter for free passage for the royal family through the Pyrenees. But the troops were not offered such passage and were decimated at the Battle of the Col de Panissars. Philip III of France died in October at Perpignan, the capital of James II of Majorca (who had fled in fear after being confronted by Peter), and was buried in Narbonne. James was declared a vassal of Peter.

== Troubadour works ==
Peter matched his father in patronage of the arts and literature, but unlike him he was a lover of verse, not prose. He favoured the troubadours, having himself created two sirventesos. The first is in the form of an exchange between himself and Peironet, a troubadour. The second is part of a compilation of five compositions from Peter himself, Bernat d'Auriac, Pere Salvatge, Roger-Bernard III of Foix, and an anonymous contributor.

As well the wars with Philip III of France and James II of Majorca furnished material for new sirventesos and during this period the sirventes was converted into a convenient tool of political propaganda in which each side could, directly or allegorically, present its case and procure sympathy propitious to its cause.

== Death and legacy ==
Peter died from unknown causes at Vilafranca del Penedès in November 1285, just one month after Philip III of France, and was buried in the Monastery of Santes Creus. His deathbed absolution occurred after he declared that his conquests had been in the name of his familial claims and never against the claims of the church. His remains are entombed in a porphyry sarcophagus at the monastery.

Peter made his final testament on 2 November 1285. In it he instructed his successor to return the kingdom of Sicily to the pope and to release all Angevin prisoners of war. Although the will was copied into the royal register, it was ignored by his successors. Peter's eldest son, Alfonso III, inherited Aragon while Sicily went to his second son, James II. His third son, Frederick, later succeeded James as king of Sicily. Peter did not provide for his illegitimate youngest son and namesake, Peter. This Peter left Spain for Portugal with his half-sister Elizabeth.

In the Divine Comedy, (Purgatory, Canto VII) Dante Alighieri sees Peter "singing in accord" with his former rival, Charles I of Anjou, outside the gates of Purgatory.

== Children ==
Peter and Constance II of Sicily had:

- Alfonso III of Aragon (4 November 1265 – 18 June 1291)
- James II of Aragon (10 August 1267 – 2 November 1327)
- Elizabeth, Queen of Portugal (c. 1271 – 4 July 1336). Married Denis of Portugal
- Frederick III of Sicily (13 December 1272 – 25 June 1337)
- Yolande, Duchess of Calabria (c. 1273 – August 1302). Married Robert of Naples
- Peter of Aragon (c. 1275 – 25 August 1296). Married Guillemette of Béarn, daughter of Gaston VII, Viscount of Béarn.

Peter had a relationship with Ines Zapata between 1275-1280 and had the following children:

- Fernando of Aragon.
- Sancho of Aragon.
- Pedro of Aragon. Married in Portugal with Constança Mendes da Silva.
- Teresa of Aragon.

Additionally, he had 3 illegitimate children with Maria Nicolau before marrying Constance of Sicily:

- Jaime Perez of Aragon (d. 1285).
- Juan Perez of Aragon.
- Beatriz of Aragon (d. 1316).

== Bibliography ==
- Aurell, Jaume (2020). Medieval Self-Coronations: The History and Symbolism of a Ritual. Cambridge: Cambridge University Press. ISBN 9781108794176.
- Burns, Robert Ignatius, ed. (1985). The Worlds of Alfonso the Learned and James the Conqueror: Intellect and Force in the Middle Ages. Princeton: Princeton University Press. ISBN 9780691054513.
- Cabrera Sánchez, Margarita (2011). "La muerte de los miembros de la realeza hispánica medieval a través de los testimonios historiográficos". En la España medieval (in Spanish). No. 34. Madrid: Universidad Complutense. pp. 97–132. ISSN 0214-3038.
- Chaytor, H.J. (1933). A History of Aragón and Catalonia. London: Methuen. ISBN 9780404014797.
- Colomer Pérez, Guifré, Memòries de la guerra de les Vespres (1282–1285). Controvèrsies ideològiques i conflictes polítics a la Mediterrània occidental, Tesi Doctoral URV, 2022 http://hdl.handle.net/10803/675697
- Harris, Jonathan (2003). Byzantium and the Crusades. London: Hambledon. ISBN 9781852852986.
- Merriman, Roger Bigelow (1918). The Middle Ages. The Rise of the Spanish Empire in the Old World and in the New. Vol. 1. The Macmillan Company.
- Previté-Orton, Charles William (1952). The Shorter Cambridge Medieval History. Vol. II The Twelfth Century to the Renaissance. Cambridge: Cambridge at the University Press.
- Riquer, Martín de (1951). "Un trovador valenciano: Pedro el Grande de Aragón". Revista Valenciana de Filología. 1 (4).

Regnal titles
Preceded by James I	King of Aragon and Valencia; Count of Barcelona; 1276–1285	Succeeded by Alfonso III
Preceded by Charles I	King of Sicily (jure uxoris); 1282–1285 with Constance II	Succeeded by James I
