= Battle of the Col de Panissars =

1285 battle of the Aragonese Crusade

Coordinates: 42°27′20″N 2°51′22″E

- Part of the Aragonese Crusade
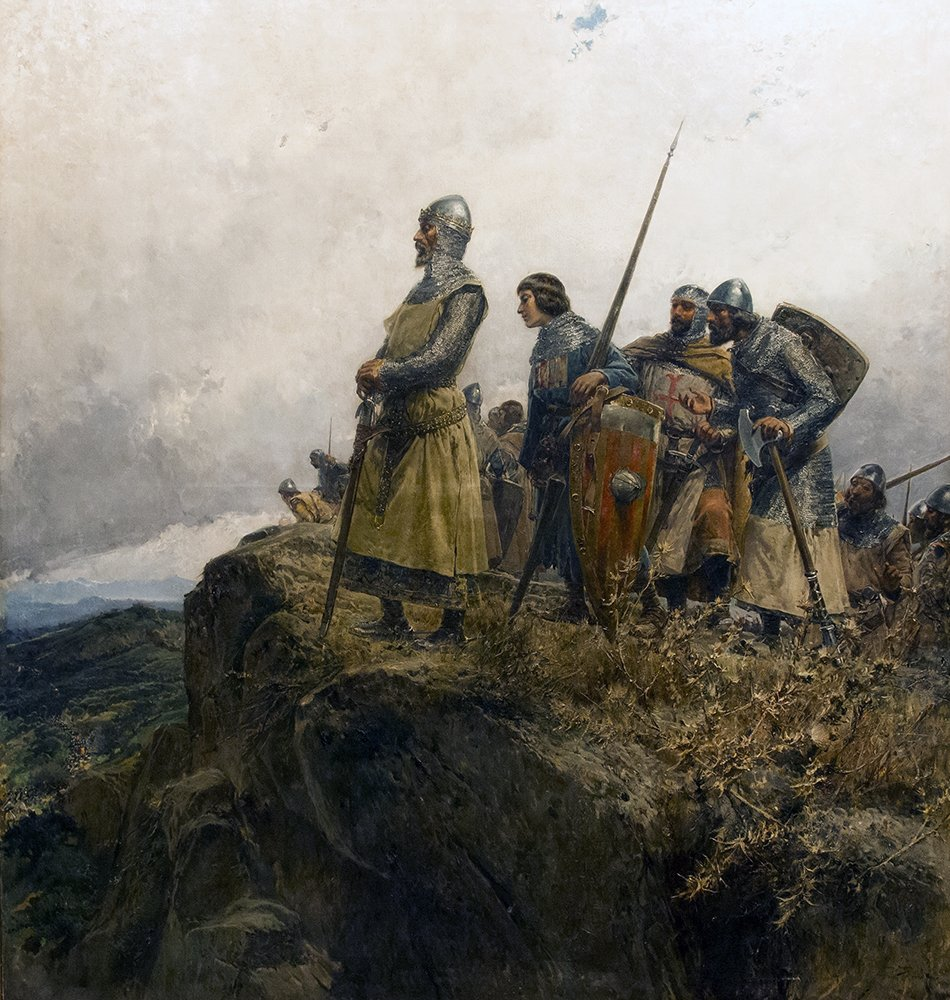
- "Peter III the Great at Col de Panissars", 1889, by Mariano Barbasán.
Date	30 September – 1 October 1285
Location	Pyrenean pass, Principality of Catalonia
Result	Aragonese victory

Belligerents
Crown of Aragon	Kingdom of France

Commanders and leaders
Peter III of Aragon; Ramon of Montcada and Roger of Lauria	Philip III of France

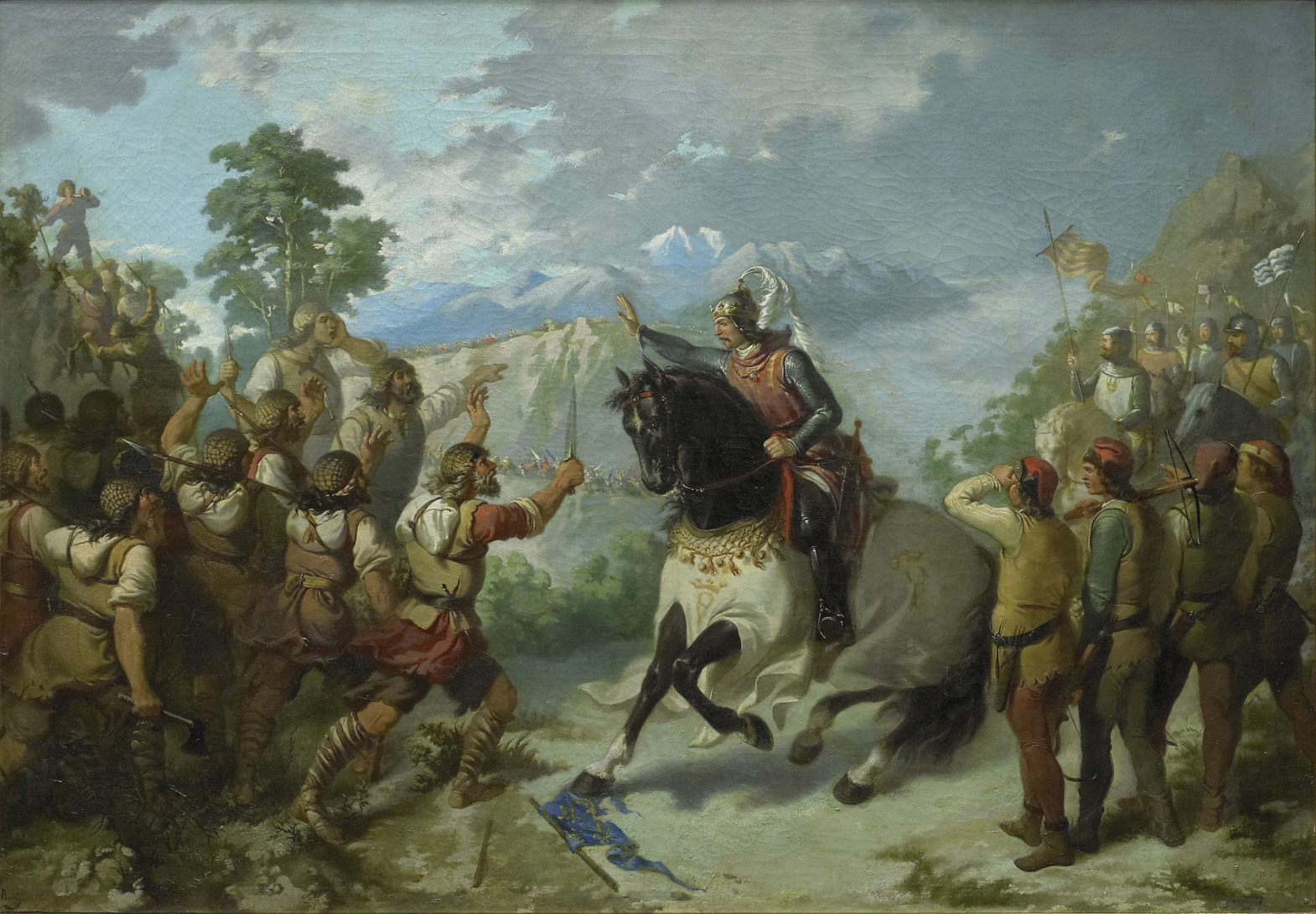
Peter the Great with his Almogavars in the Battle of the Col de Panissars, 1866, by Bartomeu Ribó Térriz

The Battle of the Col de Panissars was fought on 30 September and 1 October 1285 between the forces of Philip III of France and Peter III of Aragon. It was a severe defeat for the French, who were already retiring over the Pyrenees when the Aragonese fell on them.

It was the last battle of the Aragonese Crusade, a papally-sanctioned war on behalf of Charles of Valois to secure the Aragonese throne from the excommunicated king Peter III, who had conquered Sicily against papal interests. The battle followed on the heels of the naval victory at Les Formigues on 4 September.

== Location and battle ==
The pass around the massif of Albères (568 m) in Catalonia was the main route through the Pyrenees in the Middle Ages. The Romans had called it the Summum Pyrenæum. It has since been superseded by the Col de Perthus (or Col du Perthus) one kilometre to the northeast.

Having promised to grant passage to the French king and his family, the Aragonese troops contented themselves with attacking the retreating French army, already decimated by dysentery. Peter entrusted the vanguard to Ramon de Montcada and his Almogàvers, who massacred the fatigued French troops but spared the royal family. This first attack was followed up by a second attack by Roger de Lauria, the admiral of the fleet which had defeated the French at Les Formigues and had then disembarked to fight on land. The result of all this was a rout: the French lost further troops and there was a complete Aragonese victory. According to the chronicle of Ramon Muntaner, the festivities of celebration lasted eight days in Barcelona.

== Legacy ==
When, in 1302, Charles of Valois intervened in Sicily in support of Charles II of Naples against Frederick III of Sicily at the head of four thousand knights in the pay of the pope, Frederick reminded him of the gesture of leniency and magnanimity which his father, Peter, had shown to Charles's family at the Col de Panissars. Admitting a lack of gratefulness, Charles ceased hostilities and signed the Peace of Caltabellotta.

== Sources ==
- Chaytor, H. J. A History of Aragon and Catalonia
