= Battle of the Counts =

Neopolitan naval engagement of 1287

Coordinates: 40°50′N 14°15′E

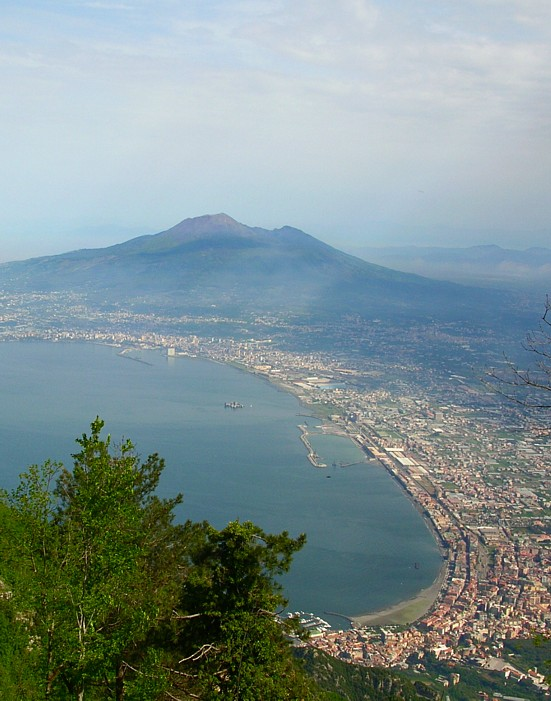
- Battle of the Counts
Date	23 June 1287
Location	near Naples, present-day Italy
Result	Aragonese victory

Belligerents
Kingdom of Sicily	Kingdom of Naples

Commanders and leaders
Roger of Lauria	Reynald III Quarrel of Avella; Narjot de Toucy

Strength
40–45 galleys	84 galleys

Casualties and losses
Unknown	5,000 crew captured 40 galleys captured

The Battle of the Counts was a naval engagement during the War of the Sicilian Vespers. Fought on 23 June 1287 between the fleets of Aragon-Sicily and Angevin Naples, the battle was a major victory for the Aragonese fleet and its commander, Roger of Lauria.

== Background ==
Following the outbreak of the War of the Sicilian Vespers in 1282, naval warfare raged between the Crown of Aragon and the Angevin Kingdom of Naples. In the early years of the conflict, a combined Aragonese-Sicilian fleet inflicted a series of defeats on the navy of Angevin Naples, which was forced to abandon Sicily in 1282. Many of the Aragonese victories were won by admiral Roger of Lauria, who defeated an Angevin fleet at the 1283 Battle of Malta, the Battle of the Gulf of Naples in 1284, and a French fleet in the 1285 Battle of Les Formigues. These victories had established Aragon as a major naval power in the region and had resulted in serious damaged being done to the Angevin-Neapolitan navy's ability to operate effectively.

Despite Aragonese successes at sea, years of war began to attrit the Aragonese navy. In addition to fighting Angevin Naples, the outbreak of the Aragonese Crusade in 1284 and the subsequent invasion of the Principality of Catalonia by France had, though ultimately ending in success for Aragon, forced the Aragonese to split their forces between Sicily and Iberia. By 1287, the Aragonese-Sicilian fleet had fallen into a state of disrepair and was suffering from a manpower shortage. Roger of Lauria arrived in Messina in the spring of 1287 and began work to quickly replenish the Aragonese fleet stationed there.

Having lost its king and its fleet in the disastrous battle in the gulf of Naples in 1284, the Angevin kingdom began an aggressive campaign to rebuild its navy. Led by Regent Robert II of Artois, the Angevin kingdom planned an ambitious offensive that would land Angevin troops on Sicily to seize control of the island. To support the invasion, Robert amassed two fleets of 40 galleys each, hoping to use the new navy to secure the waters around Sicily. One fleet was raised in Apulia, while another was raised in Campania; a major obstacle for the Angevin navy was the heavily-defended Strait of Messina, which Aragon controlled, and served as a natural barrier preventing the two Angevin fleets from consolidating.

== Battle ==
=== Prelude ===
On 16 April, the first fleet of 40 Angevin galleys put to sea from Apulia, led by Reynald III of Avella. Striking first at Malta (possibly a feint to distract the Aragonese), the Angevin fleet then sailed to and captured the town of Augusta on Sicily. The town was taken almost without resistance, emboldening the Angevins to march north to Catania, which they besieged. The town was relieved by an Aragonese-Sicilian army, and Lauria sailed his fleet of 40 galleys to retake Augusta, but the Angevin fleet was able to evade him. While the Aragonese were forced to besiege Augusta, the Angevin fleet sailed to attack the poorly-defended western coast of Sicily. While King James II of Sicily wanted Lauria's fleet to support his siege of Augusta, the admiral disagreed and sailed his fleet in pursuit of Reynald. The Angevin fleet raided a few towns in western Sicily, circumnavigated the island, and linked up with the Angevin fleet in Campania; thus, the Aragonese faced a force of over 80 galleys against their 40. Confronted with the large Angevin force now operation out of the Bay of Naples, Lauria sailed for Messina, sending out smaller ships to scout the Angevin positions. In Naples, the Angevins worked to raise an army to invade Sicily.

=== Fleet dispositions ===
Following the consolidation of the Angevin fleets, the Angevin ships were beached stern-first near the Castellammare di Stabia. In this defensive position, the Angevin galleys were almost impervious to attack. The Angevin fleet numbered some 84 galleys, 12 of which were a squadron Genoese mercenary ships commanded by Enrico de Mari. Angevin command was split between Reynald of Avella and Narjot de Tourcy, with the latter being in nominal command of the combined fleet. While the Angevins had a significant ship and manpower advantage over the Aragonese-Sicilian fleet, years of war had strained the availability of experienced crews, and many of the Angevin sailors were inexperienced.

Contrasting the Angevin fleet, Lauria's Aragonese-Sicilian fleet was highly experienced, and had been commanded in battle by Lauria many times before. Although the war had drained Aragonese resources and crews, the Aragonese and Sicilians remained motivated and had a high level of confidence in their veteran commander - the Sicilian crews in particular were motivated to defend their homeland from invasion. To further motivate his men, Lauria promised that a large share of the loot of the battle would go to his captains and crews.

Unable to attack the Angevin fleet as it lay beached, Lauria conducted a days-long campaign of raiding and taunting to lure the Angevins into battle; his forces harassed shipping in the gulf of Naples, raised Sicilian banners while dragging Angevin banners behind their ships, and Lauria issued a formal challenge to the Angevin leadership to meet him in battle. On 23 June, the Angevin fleet slid their ships into the water and sailed to meet Lauria's fleet in the gulf.

=== Battle ===
The battle began with a force of Narjot's 84 Angevin galleys advancing against a force of 40-45 Aragonese galleys under Lauria. While Lauria's forces waited in the gulf, Narjot organized his ships into diamond-like phalanxes, advancing together to try to break the Aragonese line. Each diamond was composed of nine ships, with each formation commanded by a high-ranking officer. In total, seven of these diamonds were formed, while the remaining Angevin ships followed behind as a reserve. By adopting such a formation, the Angevin ships were able to mutually support each-other while fighting in formation.

As the Angevins advanced, Lauria ordered his ships to scatter in the bay - a feint, intended to force the Angevins to pursue him and expend valuable energy in a chase. This plan worked, and the Angevin formations gradually grew further apart, stripping them of their ability to come to each-others aid if attacked. When the Angevin diamonds were sufficiently separated, Lauria's fleet turned and charged, devastating the Angevin vanguard, the disorganized positioning of the Angevin ships allowing Lauria to defeat them in detail. Several Angevin ships were disabled or captured during this action, while the remaining Angevin ships attempted to close into tighter formation.

Having crushed the Angevin vanguard, Lauria held his ships back as the main body of the Angevin fleet regrouped, letting the Angevin crews exhaust their projectiles and tire under the summer sun; soon after, the Aragonese ships closed to range with the Angevin galleys, decimating their crews with crossbows and javelins. The formations of both sides fell apart, and the battle became a fierce melee - an outcome that favored the more experienced Aragonese crews. The French-style heavy infantry were cumbersome in galley fighting, while the elite almogavar light infantry of the Aragonese proved deadly in boarding actions. Their crews depleted and oars broken, many of the Angevin galleys were captured. Seeing the destruction of the main body of the fleet, the 12 Genoese galleys fled, further disadvantaging the Angevins.

=== Aftermath ===
The battle was a decisive victory for the Aragonese and Sicilians; 40 Angevin ships were captured and an Angevin invasion of Sicily was rendered inviable. A large number of high-ranking prisoners were taken during the battle, to the point where the battle came to be known as the "Battle of the Counts".

Angevin naval power was broken after the battle and would not recover for the rest of the war. The battle effectively deprived the Angevin-French-Papal alliance of any ability to re-conquer Sicily for several years.
