= Oared vessel tactics =

Form of naval tactics

The Battle of Lepanto

Oared vessel tactics were the dominant form of naval tactics used from antiquity to the late 16th century when sailing ships began to replace galleys and other types of oared ships as the principal form of warships. Throughout antiquity, through the Middle Ages until the 16th century, the weapons relied on were the ship itself, used as a battering ram or to sink the opponent with naval rams, the melee weapons of the crew, missile weapons such as bolts from heavy crossbows fixed on the bulwarks, bows and arrows, weights dropped from a yard or pole rigged out, and the various means of setting fire to enemy ships. The latter could be done by shooting arrows with burning tow or by Greek fire ejected through specially designed siphons.

All oared vessel actions were fought at close quarters, where ramming and boarding were possible. But the use of the ram was only available for a vessel driven by oars. While fleets depended on the methods of battle at close quarters, two conditions were imposed on the warship: light structure, so that her crew could row her with effect, and a large crew to work her oars and fight in hand-to-hand combat. Sails were available by virtually all types of galleys in long-range strategic maneuvers, and to relieve the rowers. Sails were lowered in action, however, and when the combatant had a secure port at hand, the rigging could be left ashore before battle.

== Early tactics ==
From the earliest times of naval warfare boarding was the only means of deciding a naval engagement, but little to nothing is known about the tactics involved. In the first recorded naval battle in history, the battle of the Delta, the forces of Egyptian Pharaoh Ramesses III won a decisive victory over a force made up of the enigmatic group known as the Sea Peoples. As shown in commemorative reliefs of the battle, Egyptian archers on ships and the nearby shores of the Nile rain down arrows on the enemy ships. At the same time Egyptian galleys engage in boarding action and capsize the ships of the Sea Peoples with ropes attached to grappling hooks thrown into the rigging.

== Introduction of the ram ==
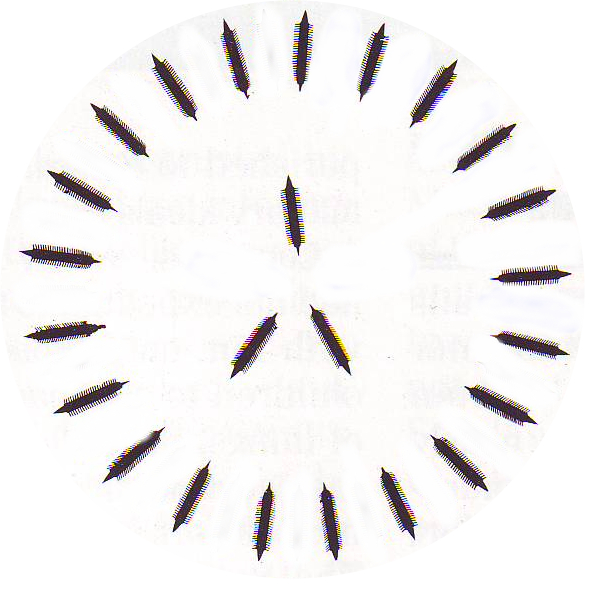
A schematic reconstruction of a defensive circle of galleys seen from above.

Around the 8th century BC, ramming began to be employed as war galleys were equipped with heavy bronze rams. Records of the Persian Wars in the early 5th century BC by the Ancient historian Herodotus (c. 484–425 BC) show that by this time ramming tactics had evolved among the Greeks. The formations could either be in columns in line ahead, one ship following the next, or in a line abreast, with the ships side by side, depending on the tactical situation and the surrounding geography. There were two primary methods for attack: by breaking through the enemy formation (diekplous) or by outflanking it (periplous). The diekplous involved a concentrated charge in line ahead so as to break a hole in the enemy line, allowing galleys to break through and then wheel to attack the enemy line from behind. The periplous involved outflanking or encircling the enemy so as to attack them in the vulnerable rear or side by line abreast. If one side knew that it had slower ships, a common tactic was to form a circle with the bows pointing outwards, thereby avoiding being outflanked. At a given signal, the circle could then fan out in all directions, trying to pick off individual enemy ships. To counter this formation, the attacking side would rapidly circle, feigning attacks in order to find gaps in the formation to exploit.

Ramming itself was done by smashing into the rear or side of an enemy ship, punching a hole in the planking. This did not actually sink an ancient galley unless it was heavily laden with cargo and stores. With a normal load, it was buoyant enough to float even with a breached hull. It could also maneuver for some time as long as the oarsmen were not incapacitated, but would gradually lose mobility and become unstable as it flooded. The winning side would then attempt to tow away the swamped hulks as prizes. Breaking the enemy's oars was another way of rendering ships immobile, rendering them into easier targets. If ramming was not possible or successful, the on-board complement of soldiers would attempt to board and capture the enemy vessel by attaching to it with grappling irons. Accompanied by missile fire, either with bow and arrow or javelins. Trying to set the enemy ship on fire by hurling incendiary missiles or by pouring the content of fire pots attached to long handles is thought to have been used, especially since smoke below decks would easily disable rowers. Rhodes was the first naval power to employ this weapon, sometime in the 3rd century, and used it to fight off head-on attacks or to frighten enemies into exposing their sides for a ramming attack.

The speed necessary for a successful impact depended on the angle of attack; the greater the angle, the lesser the speed required. At 60 degrees, 4 knots was enough to penetrate the hull, but this increased to 8 knots at 30 degrees. If the target for some reason was in motion towards the attacker, less speed was required, especially if the hit came amidships. War galleys gradually began to develop heavier hulls with reinforcing beams at the waterline, where a ram would most likely hit. There are records of a counter-tactic to this used by Rhodian ship commanders where they would angle down their bows to hit the enemy below the reinforced waterline belt. Besides ramming, breaking enemy oars was also a way to impede mobility and make it easier to drive home a successful ramming attack.

A successful ramming was difficult to achieve; just the right amount of speed and precise maneuvering were required. Fleets that did not have well-drilled, experienced oarsmen and skilled commanders relied more on boarding with superior infantry (such as increasing the complement to 40 soldiers). Ramming attempts were countered by keeping the bow toward the enemy until the enemy crew tired, and then attempting to board as quickly as possible. A double-line formation could be used to achieve a breakthrough by engaging the first line and then rushing the rearguard in to take advantage of weak spots in the enemy's defense. This required superiority in numbers, though, since a shorter front risked being flanked or surrounded.

== Boarding ==
Despite the attempts to counter increasingly heavy ships, ramming tactics were superseded in the last centuries BC by the Macedonians and Romans who were primarily land-based powers. Hand-to-hand fighting with large complements of heavy infantry supported by ship-borne catapults dominated the fighting style during the Roman era, a move that was accompanied by the conversion to heavier ships with larger rowing complements and more men per oar. Though effectively lowering mobility, it meant that less skill was required from individual oarsmen. Fleets thereby became less dependent on rowers with a lifetime of experience at the oar.

Success in ramming depended so much on a combination of skill and good fortune that it played a somewhat subordinate part in most ancient sea fights. The Romans baffled the ramming tactics of the Carthaginians by the invention of the corvus, or crow, a plank with a spike for hooking onto enemy ships which grappled the prow of the rammer, and provided a gangway for boarders. Despite its advantages, the boarding bridge had a serious drawback: since it could not be used in rough seas, the corvus may have cost the Roman Navy entire fleets in such storms. The Romans did continue their boarding tactics in the naval battles of the Punic Wars, but are also reported as ramming the Carthaginian vessels after the abandonment of the corvus. An older and alternative way for boarding was the use of grappling hooks and planks, also a more flexible system than the corvus. Agrippa introduced a weapon with a function similar to the corvus, the harpax.

=== Middle Ages ===
No later than the 7th century AD, ramming tactics had completely disappeared along with the knowledge of the original trireme and its high speed and mobility. The ram was replaced by a long spur in the bow that was designed to break oars and to act as a boarding platform for storming enemy ships. The only remaining examples of ramming tactics was passing references to attempts to collide with ships in order to roll it over on its side.

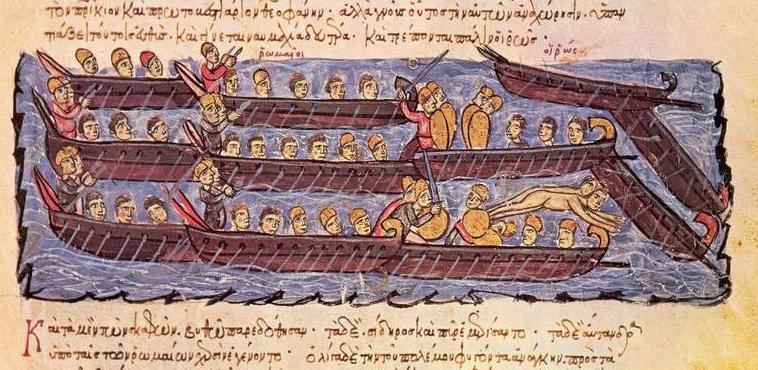
The Byzantine fleet repels the Rus' attack on Constantinople in 941. The Byzantine dromons are rolling over the Rus' vessels and smashing their oars with their spurs; Chronicle of John Skylitzes, 13th century.

The Byzantine navy, the largest Mediterranean war fleet throughout most of the Early Middle Ages, employed crescent formations with the flagship in the center and the heavier ships at the horns of the formation, in order to turn the enemy's flanks. Similar tactics are believed to have been employed by the Arab fleets they frequently fought from the 7th century onward. The Byzantines were the first to employ Greek fire, a highly effective incendiary liquid, as a naval weapon. It could be fired through a metal tube, or siphon, mounted in the bows, similar to a modern flame thrower. Greek fire was similar to napalm and was a key to several major Byzantine victories. By 835, the weapon had spread to the Arabs, who equipped harraqas, "fireships", with it.

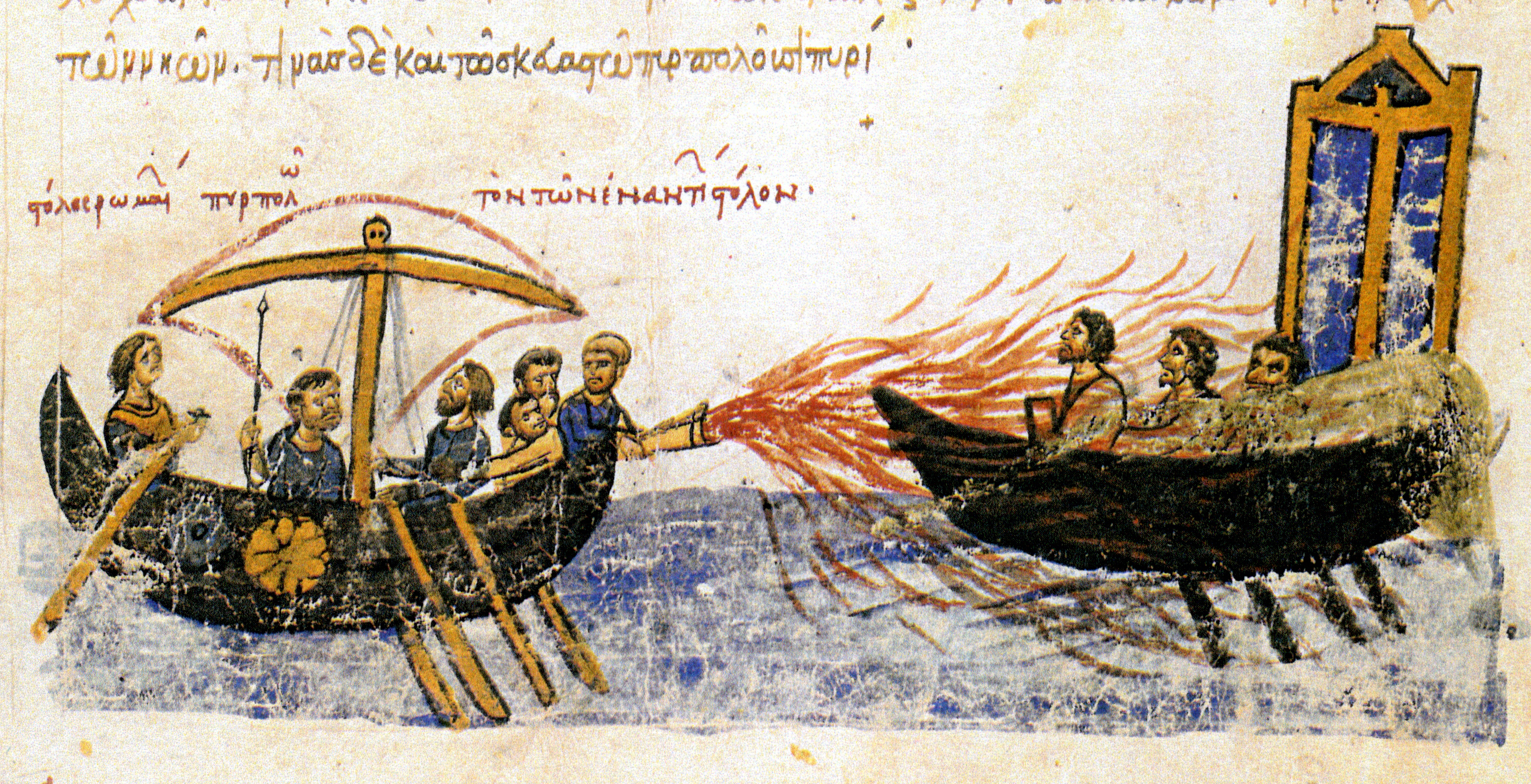
Byzantine ship attacking with Greek fire. Madrid Skylitzes manuscript, 11th century.

The initial stages in naval battles was an exchanges of missiles, ranging from combustible projectiles to arrows, caltrops, and javelins. The aim was not to sink ships, but to deplete the ranks of the enemy crews before the boarding commenced, which decided the outcome. Once the enemy strength was judged to have been reduced sufficiently, the fleets closed in, the ships grappled each other, and the marines and upper bank oarsmen boarded the enemy vessel and engaged in hand-to-hand combat. Byzantine dromons had pavesades, racks along the railings, on which marines could hang their shields, providing protection to the deck crew. Larger ships also had wooden castles on either side between the masts, which allowed archers to shoot from an elevated firing position. On Byzantine galleys, the brunt of the fighting was done by heavily armed and armored troops called hoplites or kataphraktoi. These would attempt to stab the rowers through the oarports to reduce mobility, and then join the melee. If boarding was not deemed advantageous, the enemy ship could be pushed away with poles.

Later medieval navies continued to use similar tactics, with the line abreast (i.e. side by side) formation as standard. As galleys were intended to fight from the bows, and were at their weakest along the sides, especially in the middle. The crescent formation employed by the Byzantines continued to be used throughout the Middle Ages. It would allow the wings of the fleet to crash their bows straight into the sides of the enemy ships at the edge of the formation.

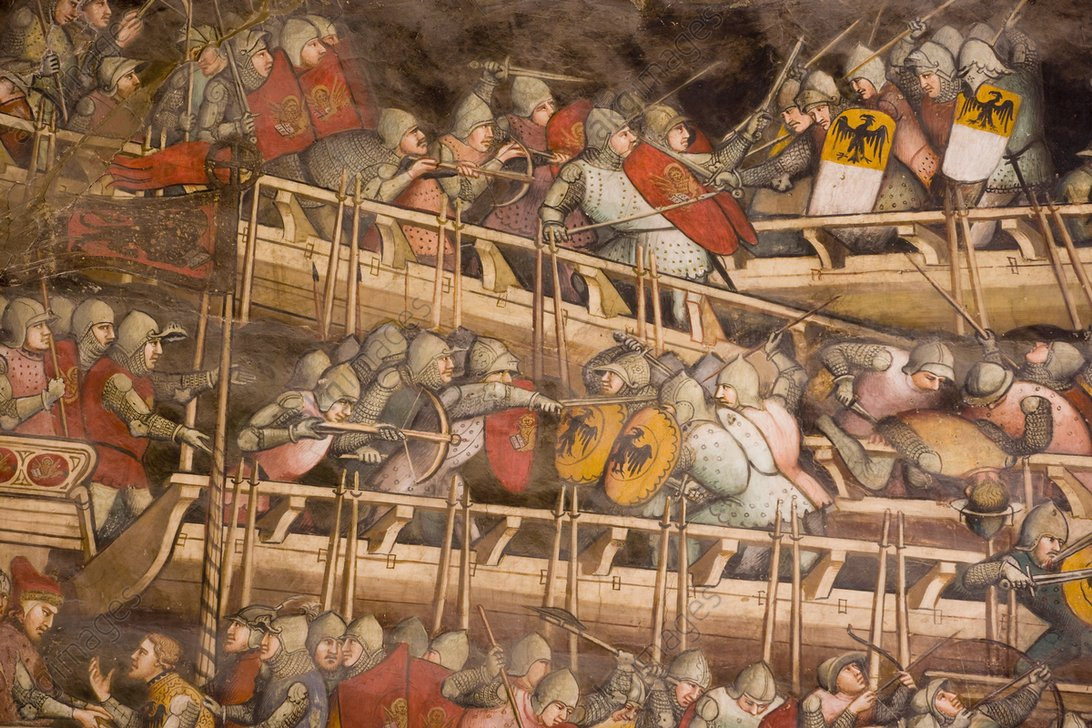
Battle between Venetian and Holy Roman fleets; detail of fresco by Spinello Aretino 1407–1408

Roger of Lauria (c. 1245–1305) was a successful medieval naval tactician who fought for the Aragon navy against French Angevin fleets in the War of the Sicilian Vespers. At the Battle of Malta in July 1283, he lured out Angevin galleys that were beached stern-first by openly challenging them. Attacking them in a strong defensive position head-on would have been very dangerous since it offered good cohesion, allowed rowers to escape ashore and made it possible to reinforce weak positions by transferring infantry along the shore. He also employed skilled crossbowmen and almogavars, light infantry, that were more nimbler in ship-to-ship actions than heavily armed and armored French soldiers. At the Battle of the Gulf of Naples in 1284, his forces launched clay cooking pots filled with soap before attacking; when the pots broke against the enemy decks, they became perilously slippery and difficult for heavy infantry to keep their feet on.

=== Early modern period ===
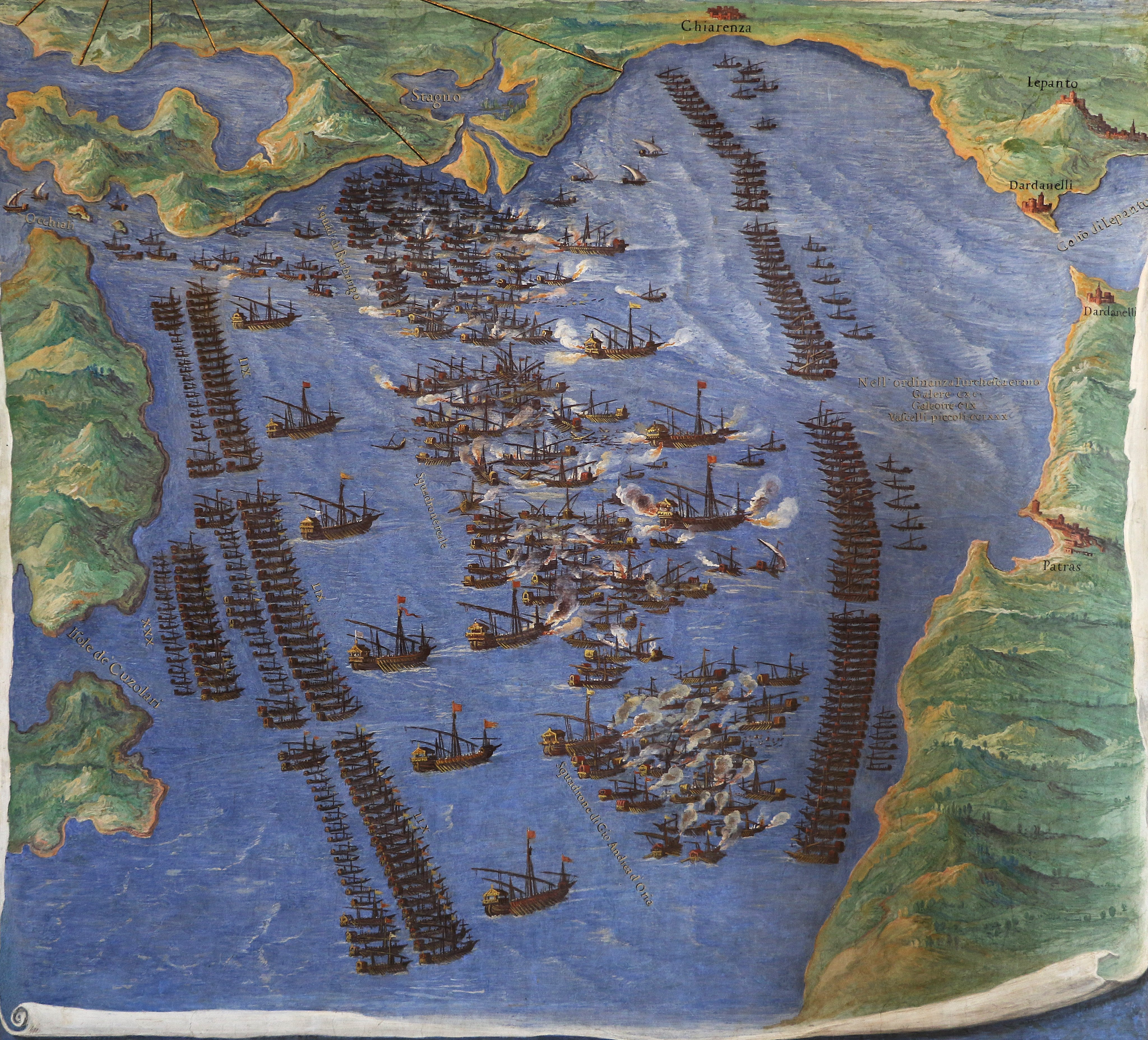
Contemporary depiction of the battle of Lepanto in 1571 that shows the strict formations of the opposing fleets. Fresco in the Gallery of Maps in Vatican Museum.

Tactics remained essentially the same until In large-scale galley engagements the end of the 16th century. The same basic crescent formation in line abreast that was employed at the battle of Lepanto in 1571 was used by the Byzantine fleet almost a millennium earlier. The practical maximum size of the front ranks of a galley formation was about 65 ships in the center with another 53–54 ships on the left and right wings. Cannons and small firearms were introduced around the 14th century, but did not have any immediate effect on tactics. If anything, the forward offensive power of galleys was accentuated by naval artillery.

Early heavy artillery on galleys was not used as a long-range standoff weapon against other gun-armed galleys. The maximum distance at which contemporary cannons were effective, c. 500 m (1600 ft), could be covered by a galley in about two minutes, much faster than the reload time of any artillery piece. Gun crews would therefore hold their fire until the last possible moment, somewhat similar to infantry tactics in the pre-industrial era of short range firearms. The bow guns would often be loaded with scatter shot and other anti-personnel ammunition. The effect of an assault with a gun-armed galley could often be dramatic, as exemplified by an account from 1528 where a galley of Genoese commander Antonio Doria. On board the ship of Sicilian Don Hugo de Moncada he witnessed how a single volley from a basilisk, two demi-cannons and four smaller guns killed 40 men.

The estimated average speed of Renaissance-era galleys was fairly low, only 3 to 4 knots, and a mere 2 knots when holding formation. Short bursts of up to 7 knots were possible for about 20 minutes, but only at the risk of exhausting rowers. This made galley actions relatively slow affairs, especially when they involved fleets of 100 vessels or more. The weak points of a galley remained the sides and especially the rear, the command center, and were the preferred targets of any attacker. Unless one side managed to outmaneuver the other, battle would be met with ships crashing into each other head on. Once the fighting began with galleys locking on to one another bow to bow, the fighting would be over the front line ships. Unless one was completely taken over by a boarding party, fresh troops could be fed into the fight from reserve vessels in the rear. In a defensive position with a secure shoreline, galleys could be beached stern first with its guns pointing out to sea. This made for a very strong defensive position, allowed rowers and sailors to escape to safety on land, leaving only soldiers and fighting men to defend against an assault.

== See also ==
- Sailing ship tactics
- Naval artillery in the Age of Sail
- Naval tactics in the Age of Steam
- Modern naval tactics
