= Bella d'Amichi =

Italian noble

Bella d'Amichi or Bella d'Amico (fl. 1245-1282), was an Italian noble and mother of Roger of Lauria.

She was from the lesser nobility of Calabria, married to Richard of Lauria and a nurse and governess of Constance II of Sicily. Bella followed Constance to Aragon upon her marriage to Peter III of Aragon in 1262. She was head lady-in-waiting, favorite and confidant to Constance. She was evidently married, as she brought her son with her to Aragon; Roger of Lauria, who was born in about 1245 and raised at the Aragonese court to be in service of Peter III. Bella d'Amichi was given a very good impression in contemporary chronicles and her warm and loving relationship to both queen Constance as well as her son has been noted. The year of her death is not known, but it is known that she accompanied the queen to Sicily in 1282, where her position as the queen's intimate favorite and confidante was again noted.
