= Formigues Islands =

Archipelago three miles from the port of Palamós, Girona Province, Catalonia, Spain

Native name: Illes Formigues
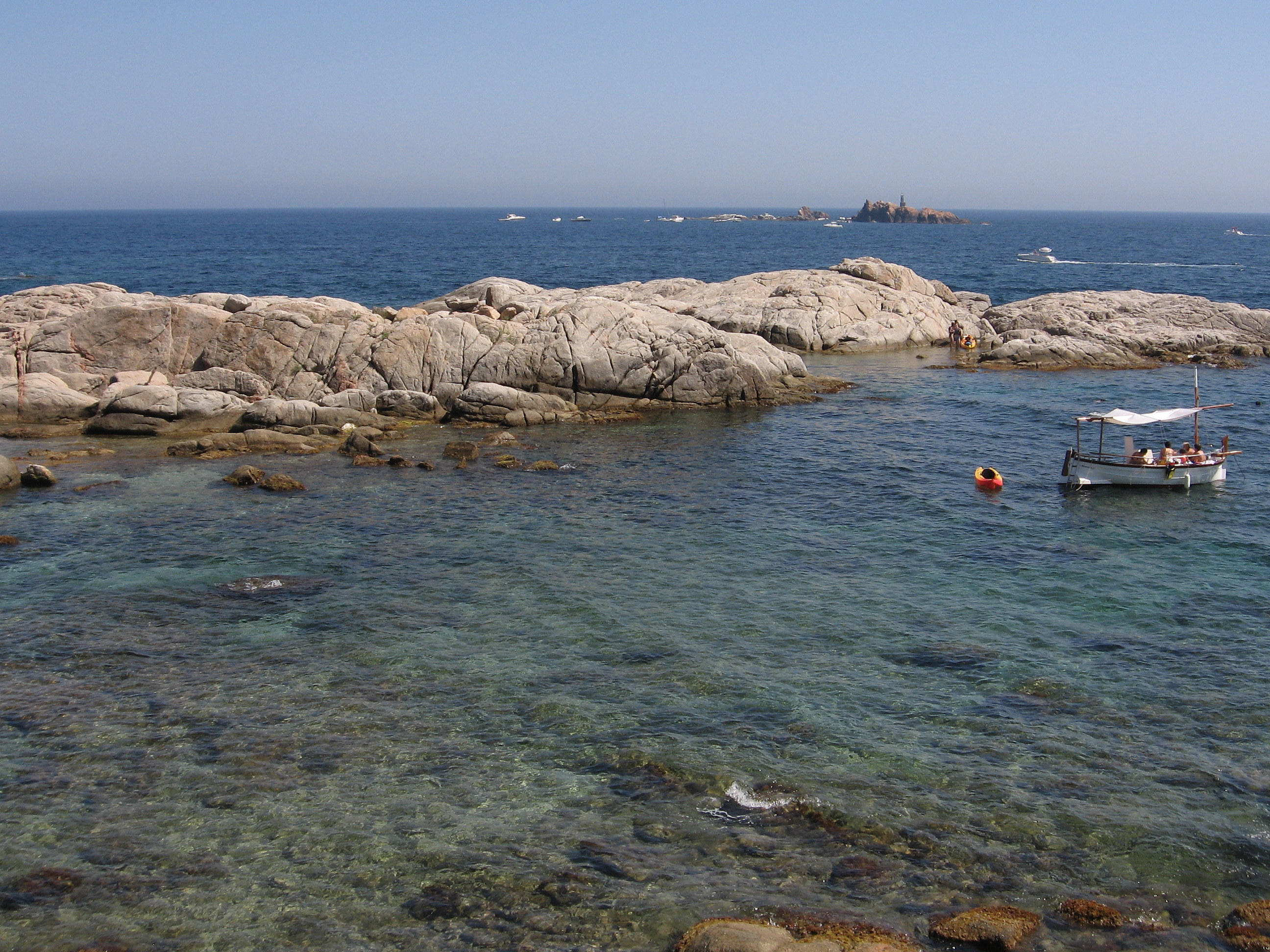
- The Formigues

- Location within Catalonia

Geography
- Coordinates: 41°51′45″N 3°11′12″E
- Total islands: 16
- Major islands: Formiga Gran

Administration
- Spain
- Community: Catalonia
- Municipality: Palamós and Palafrugell

Demographics
- Population: 0

The Formigues Islands (Catalan: Illes Formigues, Spanish: Islas Formigues) is an archipelago consisting of 16 small islands located three miles (4.8 km)from the port of Palamós, Girona Province, Catalonia, Spain. They lie facing the beach of Calella and Cap Roig. A lighthouse is located on the island of Formiga Gran (41º53'N 03º11'E). The islands are sometimes covered by waves when the sea is rough. The name of the islands is derived from the Catalan word for “ant,” referring to their size.

Administratively, they are divided between the municipalities of Palamós and Palafrugell.

The depths around the Formigues vary from 9 metres (30 feet) deep to more than 45 metres (148 feet) deep. The islands consist mostly of calcareous rock, with various caves and crags filled with rich marine vegetation, especially multicolored sea fans.

The Battle of Les Formigues took place in the islands in 1285.

The Spanish Ministry of the Natural, Rural and Marine Environment planned to declare the islands a nature reserve in 2009, prohibiting fishing in a designated area of 420 hectares. However, this was halted due to budgetary concerns.
