= Richard of Lauria =

Italian Nobleman

Richard of Lauria (died 26 February 1266) was an Italian nobleman. He was the father of admiral Roger of Lauria.

== Biography ==
He was lord of Lauria from 1254 and Scalea from 1266, and also held fiefs in Basilicata (from 1239) and Calabria. He married Bella Amico, becoming baron of Ficarra.

Roger's daughter married Corrado I Lancia, uncle of king Manfred of Sicily. Under the latter, Richard was Great Justicier and War Captain of Bari.

Richard died while fighting alongside Manfred in the Battle of Benevento, in 1266.

== Sources ==
- Rossi, Vito Pasquale (1985). Uomini Illustri di Lauria. Moliterno: Porfidio.
