= Roger of Lauria =

Italian admiral (1245–1305)

Ruggerio di Lauria i d'Amichi
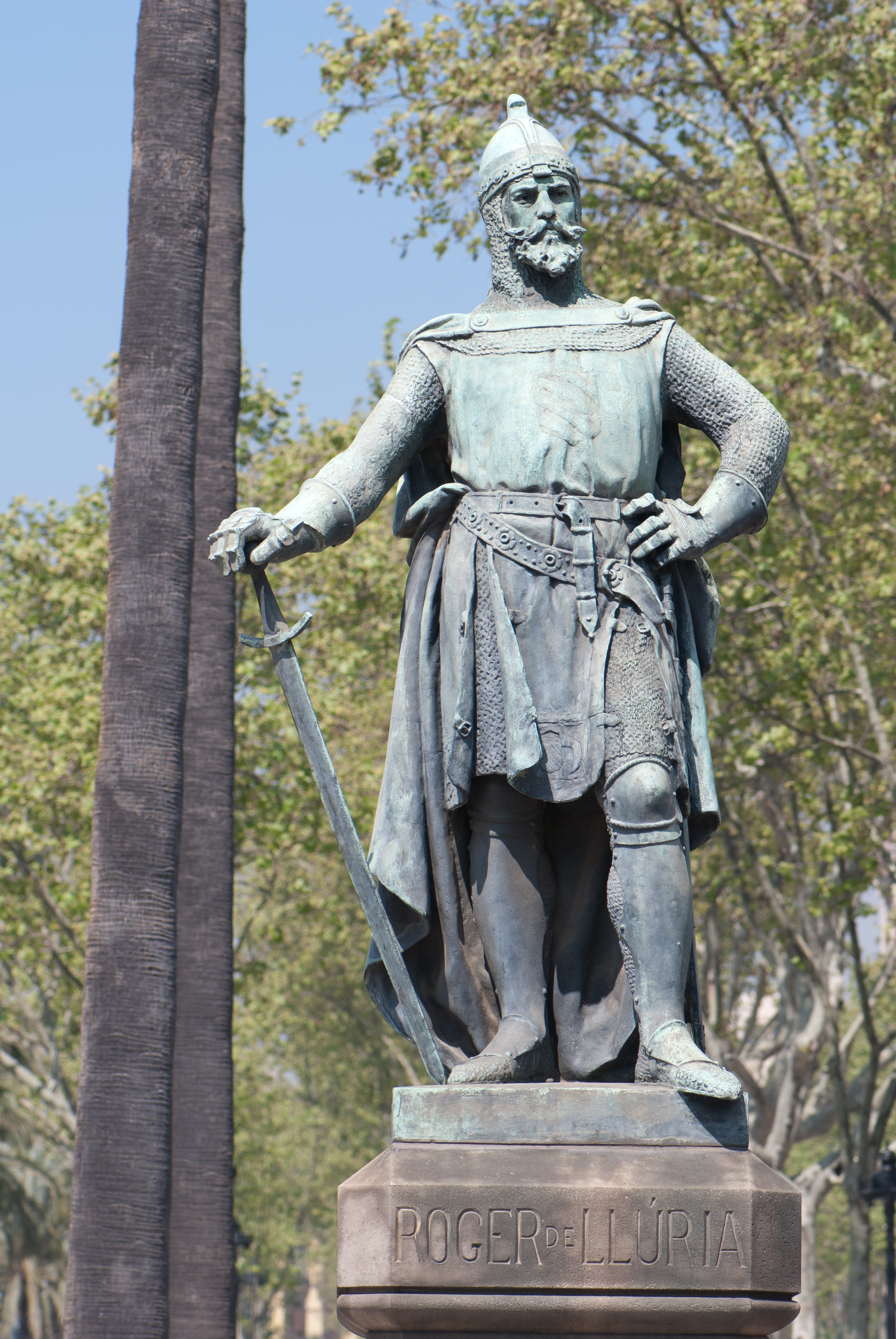
- Statue of Roger of Lauria in Barcelona
- Born: 1245; Lauria or Scalea, Kingdom of Sicily
- Died: 17 January 1305; Valencia, Kingdom of Valencia
- Military career
- Allegiance: Kingdom of Sicily
- Service years: 1283–1302
- Rank: Admiral
- Conflicts: Aragonese Crusade; Battle of the Col de Panissars; Battle of the Counts; War of the Sicilian Vespers; Battle of Malta; Battle of the Gulf of Naples; Battle of Les Formigues; Battle of Cape Orlando; Battle of Ponza (1300)

Roger of Lauria (c. 1245 – 17 January 1305), was a Calabrian knight in service of the Aragonese as admiral of the Sicilian navy. He has been described as one of the most successful and talented naval tactician of the Middle Ages. He is known as Ruggero or Ruggiero di Lauria in Italian and Roger de Llúria in Catalan.

== Biography ==
Roger of Lauria was born at Lauria (or Scalea) in what is now southern Italy, the son of Richard of Lauria, Great Justiciar of the Kingdom of Sicily, and Donna Bella, a nurse of Constance of Sicily. His father had served under King Manfred of Sicily, a Hohenstaufen; when the last member of that family, Conradin of Swabia, was beheaded at Naples in 1268. He and his mother took refuge with other Ghibelline exiles at Barcelona, capital of the Crown of Aragon.

=== Naval career ===
Later, King Peter III of Aragon, who had married Constance of Hohenstaufen, made him a knight together with Corrado Lancia, who was to be a comrade of Roger in many of his enterprises as well as brother-in-law. King Peter arranged a marriage between Roger and Corrado's sister, Margherita, in 1273. The marriage, Rogers' first of two, produced offspring. In 1282, Roger was named commander of the Aragonese fleet, keeping this post under Peter's successors James II and Frederick III.

Roger of Lauria commanded the Aragonese fleet during the campaign to capture Sicily from the Angevins after the Sicilian Vespers revolt in 1282, which made the Aragonese rulers of Sicily. He fought and won six naval galley battles in total. On 8 July 1283, he defeated the Angevins in the Grand Harbour at the Battle of Malta. On 5 June 1284, he defeated the Neapolitan fleet at the Battle of Castellammare and even captured the enemy commander, Charles of Salerno (the future Charles II of Naples).

On 4 September 1285, during the Aragonese Crusade, he defeated the French near Barcelona at the Battle of Les Formigues, which destroyed for a long time the French naval power in the Mediterranean. Within days, he had landed and taken part in the Battle of the Col de Panissars. On 23 June 1287, he again defeated the Angevins near Naples at the Battle of the Counts, despite being outnumbered forty ships to eighty. After this victory, without any authorization from King James, he made a truce with the Neapolitans. Observers noted that this truce probably deprived the Aragonese-Sicilians of the victory also on the mainland.

=== Lord of Aci ===
When Frederick III was elected King of Trinacria (Sicily), Roger received the fief of Aci and the annexed castle stripped from the bishops of Catania as rewards for his victories. However, the relationship between the admiral and the young King soon soured; when the former passed to the Angevins, Aci was besieged and captured by Frederick, and Roger took refuge at his summer residence in Castiglione di Sicilia. Again besieged and defeated, he was arrested and brought to Palermo. However, he managed to escape and left Sicily, while all his fiefs were confiscated. Roger then entered the service of Edward I of England to fight against the French. But, in spite of his promises, he returned to Italy, where, on 4 July 1299, he defeated the Sicilians near Sicily at the Battle of Cape Orlando, capturing eighteen enemy galleys.

He had another victory on 14 June 1300, the Battle of Ponza. After the Peace of Caltabellotta, he submitted to Frederick and received a full pardon. He retreated to Cocentaina in the Kingdom of Valencia, where he died in 1305.

== Tactics ==
Roger was successful in naval warfare because of his skilled naval command and use of tactics. He tried to lure enemy fleets out of defended ports, pretending to retreat and getting them to chase him until they became disorganized, then turning in formation to attack. He had much more control over his captains than his foes did. His crews were made up of specialized troops, instead of the more generic types used by his enemies. His archers and crossbowmen were used initially, while his oarsmen and/or Almogavars (unarmoured and highly mobile elite troops armed with two javelins, a lance and a dagger) stayed under cover. When his galleys closed, often from the sides of the enemy galleys (which damaged their oars), these skirmishers were much more agile than the heavily armoured knights with swords his enemies often used, especially on the moving deck of a galley at sea. He used trickery to disguise the size of his force. In addition, he sometimes kept some of his galleys hidden, to attack the rear of the enemy after the battle had started.

== Namesakes ==
- The Regia Marina (Royal Navy) battleship Ruggiero di Lauria, completed in 1888 and stricken in 1909, was named for Roger of Lauria.
- Roger de Lauria was an Oquendo-class destroyer in the Spanish Navy, launched in 1967 and stricken in 1982.
- The Spanish Navy thought of naming F-102, an Alvaro de Bazán-class air warfare destroyer, the new Roger de Lauria, but finally the ship was christened Almirante Juan de Borbón.
- The Spanish Navy's future frigate F-112 will be named after him.
- One of the main paratrooper units of the Spanish army is named after him.
