= Mariano Barbasán =

Spanish painter (1864–1924)

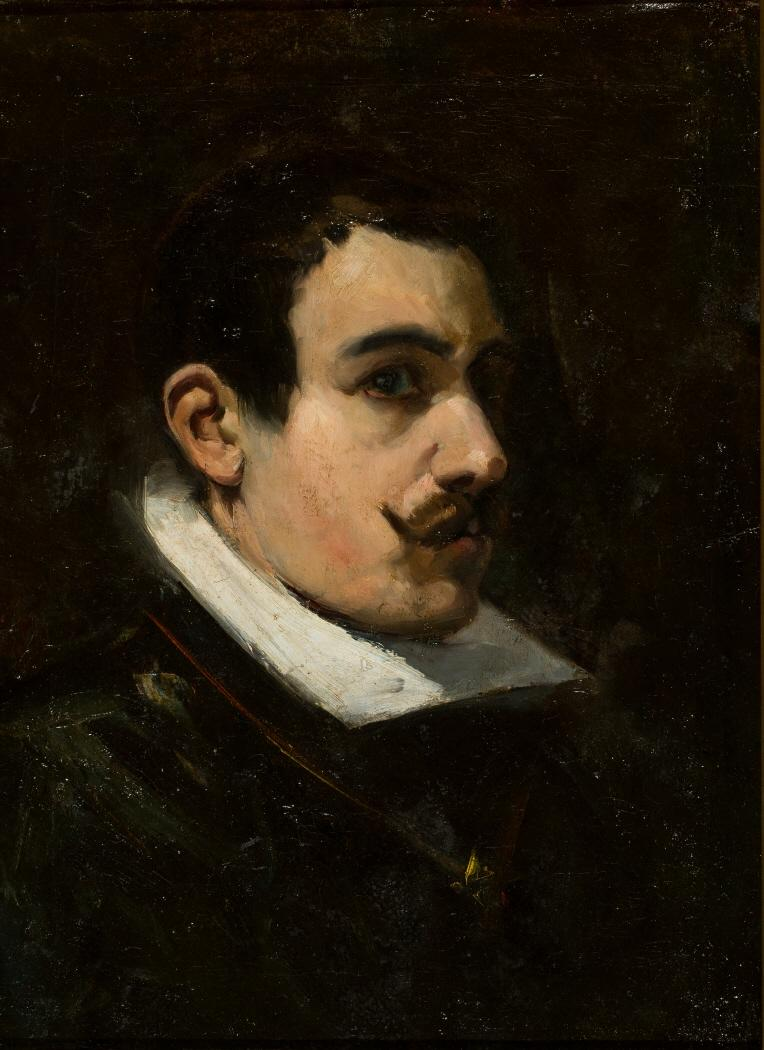
- Mariano Barbasán, Self-portrait, 1887
- Born: 3 February 1864; Zaragoza, Spain
- Died: 22 July 1924 (aged 60); Madrid, Spain
- Education: Real Academia de Bellas Artes de San Carlos, Valencia; es:Academia de España en Roma
- Known for: Painter
- Movement: Orientalist; Realist

Mariano Barbasán Lagueruela (3 February 1864 – 22 July 1924) was a Spanish painter of genre scenes and cityscapes in the Realist style; later influenced by Impressionism.

== Biography ==
He was born in Zaragoza. From 1880 to 1887, he attended the Real Academia de Bellas Artes de San Carlos in Valencia). Upon graduating, he moved to Madrid and became a historical painter; specializing in scenes from the history of Toledo, which he visited frequently. He also did some scenes from literature and presented his rendering of the Walpurgisnacht of Faust at the National Exhibition of Fine Arts.

In 1889, thanks to his painting "Joseph Interpreting the Cup-bearer's Dream", he received a stipend from the "Diputación Provincial de Zaragoza" to continue his studies at the Spanish Academy in Rome. While there, he painted mostly landscapes and scenes of rural life.

He eventually decided to live there and opened a studio; making occasional trips to Subiaco and Anticoli Corrado to paint en plein aire. He held frequent exhibits throughout Germany, Austria and England, but not in Spain, as a result of which he was little-known in his home country. In 1912, he lived in Montevideo for a short time while overseeing two exhibitions there.

He stayed in Rome until 1921, when his health began to worsen. Returning to Spain, he took a chair at the "Academia de Bellas Artes de San Luis" in Zaragoza, which had recently become vacant due to the death of Francisco Pradilla. It was two years later that he held his first retrospective exhibition, at the Central Market in Zaragoza. He died in Zaragoza, aged 60.

In 1925, his son organized a new, more formal exhibition that helped establish his reputation in Spain.

== Selected paintings ==
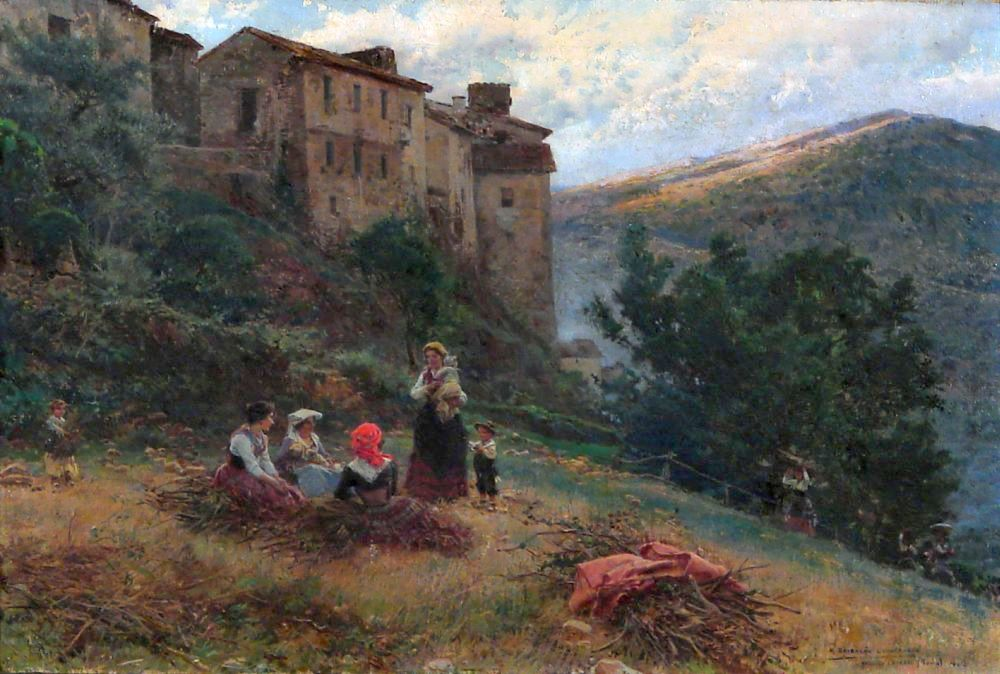
Landscape near Anticoli Corrado

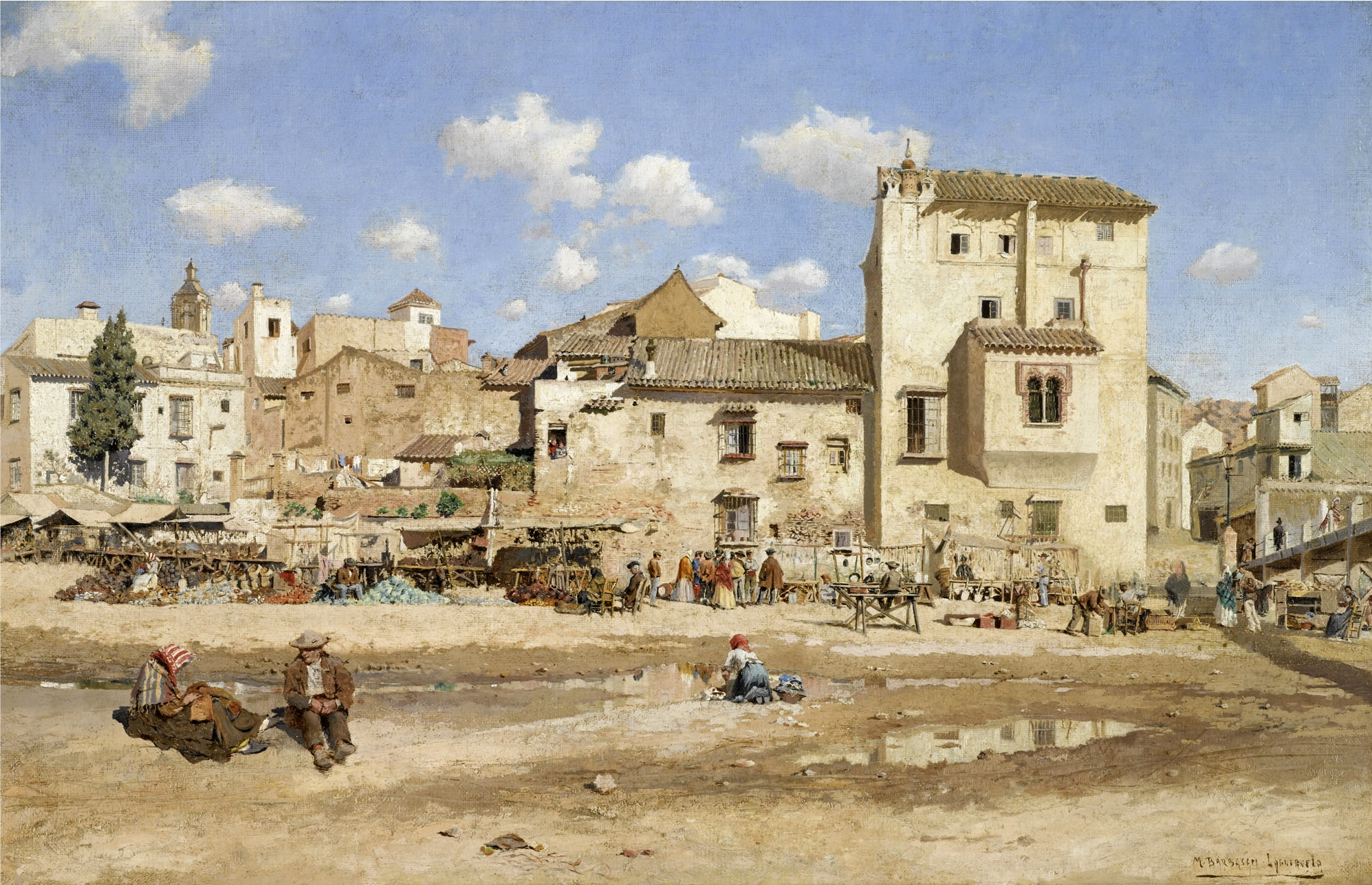
Village Street

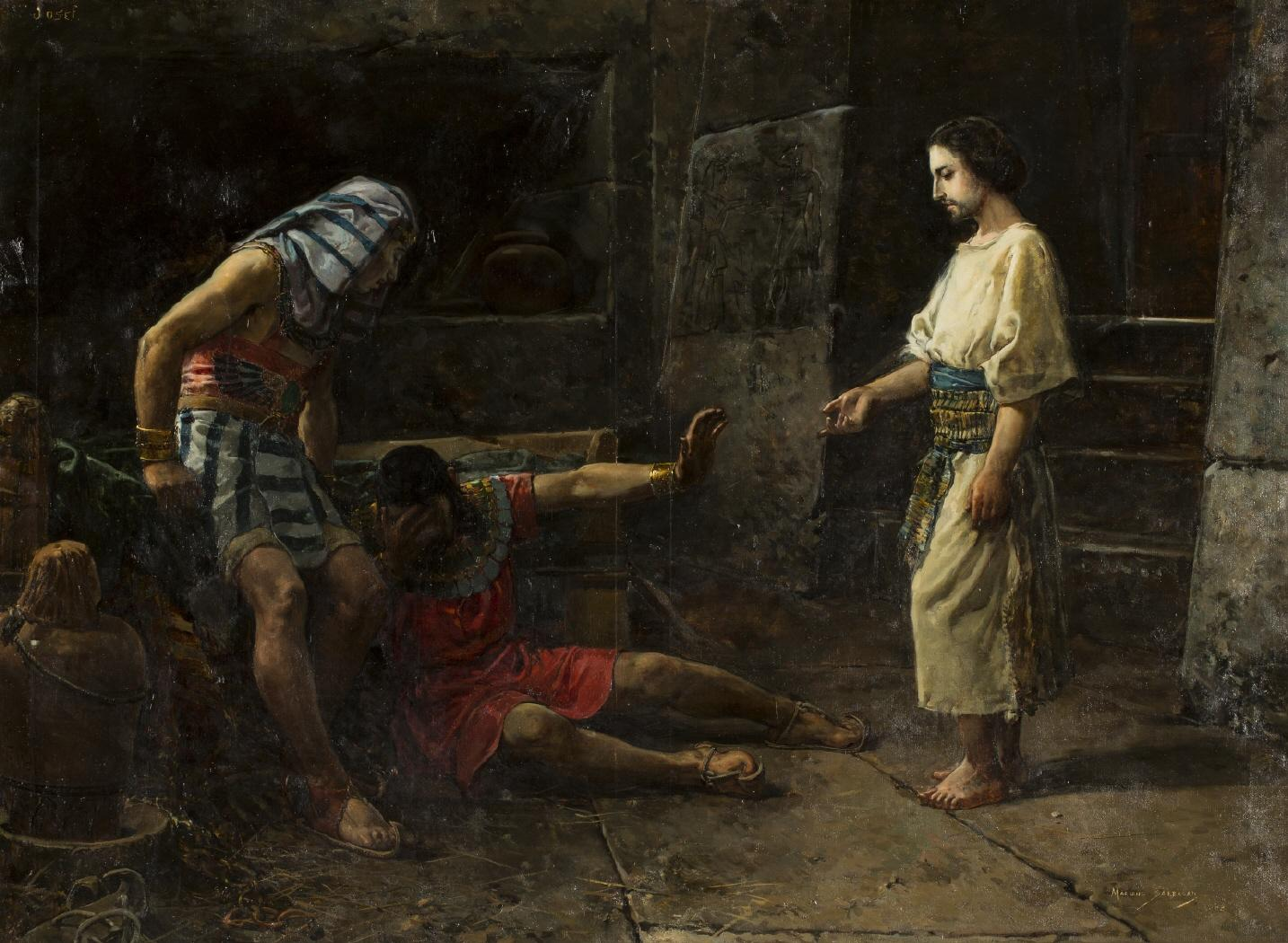
Joseph Interpreting
the Cup-bearer's Dream
