= Battle of the Gulf of Naples =

1284 naval battle during the War of the Sicilian Vespers

Coordinates: 40.7000°N 14.4833°E

- Part of War of the Sicilian Vespers
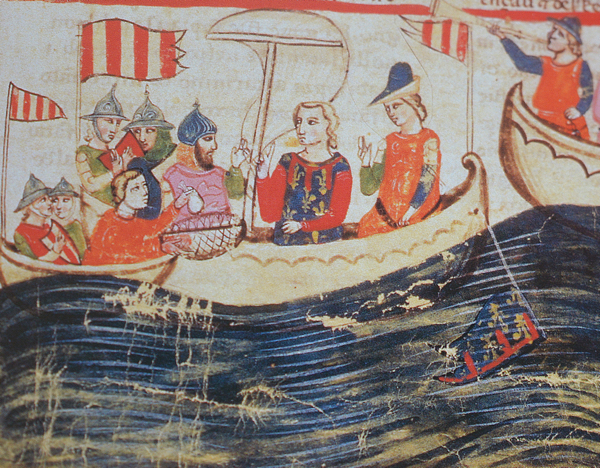
Date	5 June 1284
Location	Gulf of Naples, near Naples, present-day Italy
Result	Aragonese victory

Belligerents
Crown of Aragon	Kingdom of Naples

Commanders and leaders
Roger of Lauria	Charles of Salerno (POW)

Strength
30 galleys	28 galleys

Casualties and losses
Light	10 galleys captured

The Battle of the Gulf of Naples was a naval engagement during the War of the Sicilian Vespers. Fought on 5 June 1284 in the south of the Gulf of Naples, the battle saw an Aragonese–Sicilian fleet commanded by Roger of Lauria defeat a Angevin fleet commanded by Prince Charles of Salerno. Charles was captured during the battle, and the Aragonese victory helped secure Aragonese control of the sea around Sicily.

== Background ==
Following the Sicilian Vespers in early 1282, war broke out between the Angevin Kingdom of Naples and a collection of cities on Sicily. The war expanded when the Crown of Aragon intervened on the Sicilians' behalf, landing an army on Sicily and successfully forcing the Angevin king, Charles of Anjou, to evacuate the island.

While Aragon occupied Sicily, Charles of Anjou worked to rebuild his kingdom's naval power, as he had lost a number of ships during his evacuation of the island. Operating from ports in Sicily, the Aragonese navy hoped to disrupt this naval buildup, as Aragonese control of the sea rendered any Angevin attempt to invade Sicily inviable. In the summer of 1283, Aragonese–Sicilian admiral Roger of Lauria won a major victory against the Angevins at the Battle of Malta, establishing himself as Aragon's leading admiral. Frustrated by the poor performance of his navy, Charles of Anjou accelerated his naval buildup, replacing his existing captains with new commanders whom he hoped would be more aggressive.

Leveraging the resources of his fiefs in France, Italy, Greece and the Balkans, by 1284 Charles of Anjou had amassed a combined fleet of around 200 ships, facing 40–50 ships under Lauria's command. The Angevin ships were scattered across Charles' empire, however, and so Lauria chose to attack them in detail before they could consolidate. His primary target was the Angevin fleet based out of Charles' capital of Naples, which was commanded by Charles' son and heir, Prince Charles of Salerno.

In the spring of 1284, Lauria and his fleet began raiding the coast of southern Italy, hoping to draw the prince into battle. The latter was under orders from his father not to engage the Aragonese fleet, as a fresh fleet of 30 Angevin galleys was due to set sail from Marseille in late June. Lauria received word of this reinforcing fleet, and so on 4 June he ordered his fleet to sail into the Gulf of Naples.

== Battle ==
On the morning of 5 June, the Aragonese fleet under Lauria arrived in the Gulf of Naples. Leaving 10 of his ships at Castellammare, Lauria then led his main force of 20 galleys to the mouth of Naples' harbor, taking up positions just outside the city's breakwater. Wary that Lauria's fleet would blockade the city, and, seeing that the Aragonese had only 20 galleys against his 28, Charles chose to sail and engage Lauria in battle.

Seeing the Angevin fleet forming up to engage him, Lauria withdrew his force southwards towards Castellammare, where his remaining 10 ships waited. The less experienced Angevin fleet, assuming the Aragonese were fleeing, chased Lauria's fleet south. As the morning continued, the Angevin ships gradually grew spread out as rowers tired, while the more veteran Aragonese–Sicilian crews maintained formation. As his fleet approached Castellammare, Lauria ordered his ships form up line abreast (side by side) and recalled his 10 hidden ships into his fleet. Charles' fleet, not expecting the Aragonese to turn and fight, crashed into the center of the Aragonese line, allowing Lauria's flanks to swing down and catch the Angevin vanguard in a pincer. Strung out during the pursuit south, several of the ships in Charles' rear line fled, leaving his remaining ships badly outnumbered. Charles' flagship was sunk during the battle, and the prince himself taken prisoner.

=== Aftermath ===
Lauria's fleet captured 10 Angevin galleys at the battle. The loss of the fleet caused a riot in Naples, damaging Angevin prestige. Prince Charles of Salerno would remain an Aragonese prisoner until 1288.

While the battle had been an Aragonese success, the loss of Charles' fleet did not overly impact the naval balance of power in southern Italy, as the Angevins still maintained a sizable numerical advantage in ships.

== Ships involved ==
=== Aragon-Sicily (Roger of Lauria) ===
- about 29 galleys
- some transports
- some small vessels

=== Neapolitans (Charles of Salerno) ===
- 15–18 Neapolitan-crewed galleys
- 9–13 French-crewed galleys
- (about 28 galleys total, possibly more)
