= Battle of Malta (1283) =

Battle during the War of the Sicilian Vespers

Coordinates: 35°53′41.4″N 14°31′13.5″E

- Part of War of the Sicilian Vespers
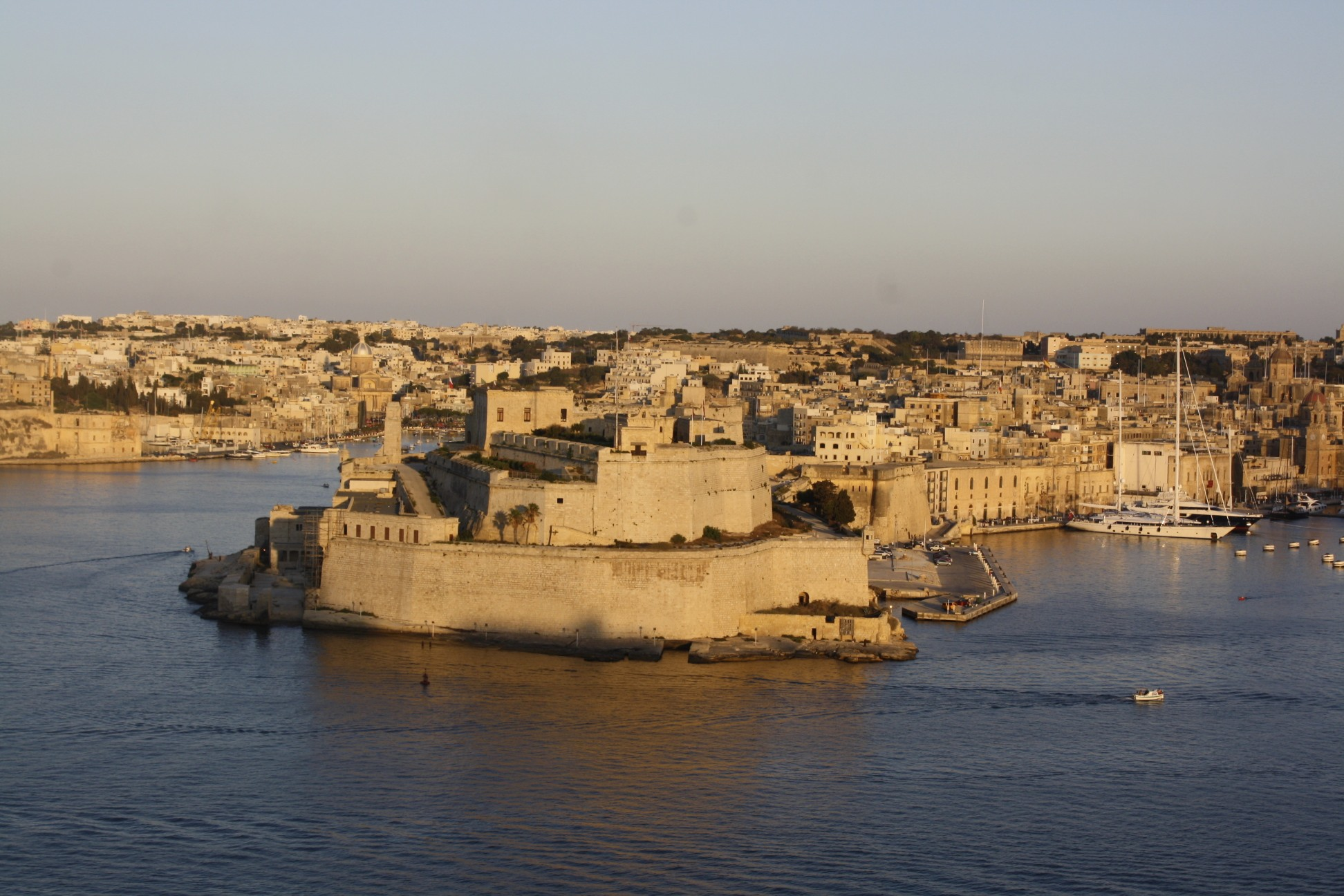
- The Castello del Mare (modern day Fort Saint Angelo), seen from Valletta. The castle has undergone many renovations and re-modellings since the 13th century.
Date	8 July 1283
Location	Grand Harbour, Malta
Result	Aragonese victory

Belligerents
Crown of Aragon	Kingdom of Naples

Commanders and leaders
Roger of Lauria	(Kingdom of Naples) Guillaume Cornut †; Bartholomé Bonvin

Strength
18–21 galleys 5,500 men	19–22 galleys 7,800 men

Casualties and losses
300 men dead 200 men injured	3,500 men dead 860 men prisoners 10 galleys captured 2 galleys scuttled

The Battle of Malta took place on 8 July (Note: There is notable confusion in the sources regarding the actual date of the naval engagement. Half the sources state the battle occurred on 8 July, while the others assert it happened on 8 June. This article follows the convention established in The Cambridge Medieval History, Volume VI – published in 1929, which establishes the month of the battle as July.) 1283 in the entrance to the Grand Harbour, the principal harbour of Malta, as part of the War of the Sicilian Vespers. An Aragonese fleet of galleys, commanded by Roger of Lauria, attacked and defeated a fleet of Angevin galleys commanded by Guillaume Cornut and Bartholomé Bonvin.

The Angevin ships arrived in Malta first, and proceeded to relieve the Angevin garrison, which was besieged within the walls of the Castello del Mare. The galleys were followed in close pursuit by an Aragonese fleet. Lauria drew the Angevin-Provençal fleet into a battle, and destroyed almost all of Cornut and Bonvin's vessels. The defeat forced Charles I of Naples to postpone his plan to invade Sicily.

== Background and planning ==
In the mid 13th Century, the strategically important island of Malta was ruled by the Angevin Kingdom of Naples and Sicily under Charles I of Anjou. The island had strategic and commercial importance to both the Angevin Kingdom and the competing Crown of Aragon, with both realms desiring control over the island.

In April 1282, the populace of Sicily rose in rebellion against Angevin rule in the Sicilian Vespers. After some political maneuvering, the Sicilian rebels invited Peter III of Aragon to take the Sicilian Crown. Peter landed an army on Sicily, and by October the Aragonese–Sicilian forces had expelled the remaining Angevin forces from Sicily.

With revolt flaring on Sicily and open war raging between Aragon and Angevin Naples, the Maltese populace rose in a general insurrection on the islands in the autumn of 1282. The revolt was bolstered by an Aragonese force led by Manfred de Lancia, brother-in-law of Aragon's leading admiral, Roger of Lauria. The Aragonese were also led by Corrado I Lancia, first count of Caltanissetta, and brother of Manfred.

Facing an Aragonese army and the civil population, the Angevin garrison found themselves besieged in the Castello del Mare in the Grand Harbour, an ancient citadel which occupied one of the headlands marking the harbour, and the castle's suburb of Birgu.

=== Angevin relief force ===
Knowing that control of Malta was vital to re-establishing his control over Sicily, Charles of Anjou began preparing a naval force to relieve the garrison of Malta and drive off the Aragonese. The Angevin fleet, however, had been badly attritted by the early months of the war (most notably during the evacuation of Messina and Battle of Nicotera) and so had to be replenished. Charles drew manpower from his holdings in Provence, Narbonne and Marseille to rebuild his fleet (Note: The King bade Cornut to recruit "...men of good birth, all of Marseilles and of the coast of Provence, and not to put in a man of any other nation, but only true Provençals, and to provide them with boatswains and steersmen, and the prows should have double armament."), placing it under the command of Guillaume Cornut, a scion of a famous Marseillais family of mercenaries, and Bartholome Bonvin, a member of a prominent merchant family. The fleet was to sail to Naples to gather more ships, and then sail to relieve Malta.

In May 1283, the twenty-five Angevin vessels arrived in Naples from Marseille, where they refreshed their men. The two admirals then set sail from Naples, with a total of about eighteen galleys, (Note: Ramon Muntaner, the Catalan chronicler, reports that twenty-two galleys set sail for the western end of Sicily, without describing their specific make-up, construction or type.) eight or nine barques, (Note: Small galleys with about twenty-four oars) and a panfilus. (Note: A light galley with around one hundred oars) The Angevin fleet sailed around Sicily, by way of the Aeolian Islands and Ustica, then off Trapani and the west end of the island. The fleet avoided the Strait of Messina, which was in Aragonese hands. According to the contemporary Ramon Muntaner in his chronicle, the Angevins sent three light scouting galleys (Note: Probably three sagittae, or "arrows" which were small scouting vessels of up to sixteen oars), towards the Boca del Faro, in front of the small tower of the Messina lighthouse. These three vessels were intended to monitor the Aragonese fleet and then rendezvous with the main Angevin force at Malta, but were intercepted and captured by the Aragonese, and so the Angevin admirals were not entirely aware of movements by the Aragonese fleet.

=== Aragonese response ===
With its victories at Messina and Nicotera, the Aragonese fleet in Sicily had gained an early advantage in the war. Morale in the fleet was high, with the predominantly Catalan and Sicilian crews being highly motivated. When King Peter III departed for Aragon, he left a sizeable force of galleys under the command of Admiral Roger of Lauria. This fleet raided the coast of Calabria, striking the Angevin forces at several points.

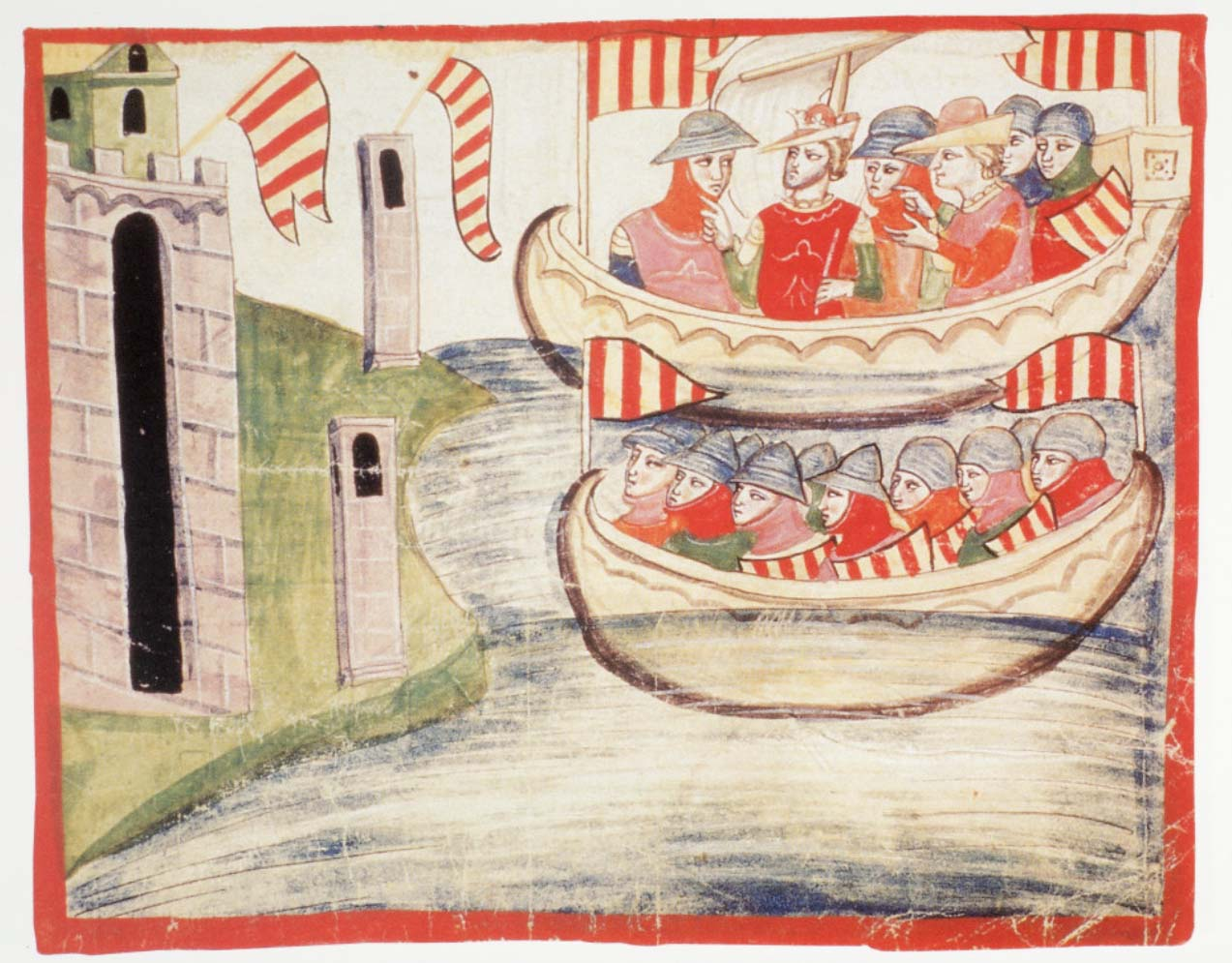
Peter III of Aragon lands at Trapani, manuscript in the Vatican Library. The king is depicted directing the landing, second from left in the upper boat, wearing the crown and a red tunic.

Basing the Aragonese fleet in Messina, Lauria waited for signs of Angevin activity; when news arrived (likely from fishing vessels) that an Angevin fleet had sailed from Naples, he took on fresh recruits and prepared to intercept it with a fleet of 20 galleys. On his first sailing day he made for Syracuse and asked for news on the Angevin fleet. A barge had arrived from Gozo with news that the enemy fleet had already landed on Malta. The day after, the Aragonese set sail southwards for Malta, leaving Syracuse and reaching Capo Passero. After resting overnight, the Aragonese fleet set sail for the south east coast of Sicily, rather than head for Malta directly. After putting in at Fonte di Scicli, Lauria landed all his men to rest in Scicli to prepare themselves for the coming battle.

== Battle ==
As the Angevin relief fleet approached Malta, the Aragonese forces besieging the Castello retreated to the old city of Citta Notabile. The Angevin fleet under Cornut and Bonvin laid anchor in the grand harbor, beaching their galleys along Dockyard creek and stationing picket ships at the harbor's entrance.

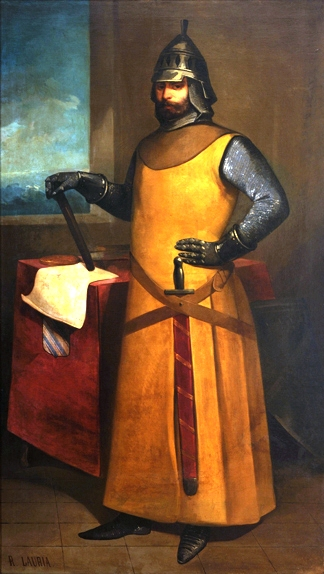
Admiral Roger of Lauria, painting by Nicolás Ruiz de Valdivia y Aguilera.

The Aragonese forces arrived soon (Note: The Angevin fleet arrived on either (depending on the un-decided date of the battle) 4 June or 4 July, with the Aragonese fleet arriving on either 7 June or 7 July.) after the Angevin fleet. Lauria was able to discover the disposition of the Angevin fleet; according to the contemporary Muntaner Chronicle, an Aragonese ship with muffled oars snuck into the grand harbor to observe the Angevins, while sources note he also could have received intelligence from Aragonese scouts on land.

On the morning of 8 July, Lauria maneuvered the Aragonese fleet into the grand harbor. The Aragonese admiral ordered his ships to be connected together with heavy chains—this tactic, developed by the Genoese navy, prevented enemy galleys from penetrating Lauria's position, and allowed for the Aragonese to rain down a deadly hail of crossbow fire. Lauria also modified the formation so that his ships stood apart with room for their oars to be deployed, thus allowing for his fleet to advance forward as a unit. In a move that surprised his crews, he ordered that his fleet trumpet their arrival to the Angevins, foregoing a surprise attack. The Muntaner Chronicle speculates that Lauria wished to assert his skill as an admiral in open and chivalrous combat, while more modern sources speculate the sounding of trumpets was a ruse to draw the enemy out from their protected anchorage.

Not wanting to be blockaded in the harbor, the Angevin fleet set sail and prepared for battle. According to a later account, the Angevin admirals received faulty intelligence from a ship they had sent to scout the Aragonese fleet, and so believed they only faced 11–12 enemy galleys. Bolstered by hundreds of men from the relived garrison, the Angevins now had a manpower, if not ship, advantage. The fleets remained relatively equally matched, with both sides having experienced crews. The Angevins, with their French-Provencal knights, had an advantage in heavy infantry, while the elite almogavars and crossbowmen in the Aragonese crews made them dangerous at range. One source notes that, while both the Angevin and Aragonese forces placed great value on the crossbow, the design of the Aragonese ships (which tended to have higher than average forecastles) granted the Aragonese crews increased protection from bolt-fire.

The fleets advanced towards each other in the Grand Harbor, with fighting starting around daybreak. The Angevin forces launched protracted waves of missiles, mostly crossbow bolts and lime, at the Aragonese, while Lauria ordered his forces to take cover on their ships and return fire only with crossbows. By midday the Angevins had run out of ammunition, and so Lauria ordered his fleet to advance. At close range, the Aragonese raked the Angevin galleys with crossbow bolts and deadly javelins, killing many of the Angevin sailors. With their crews depleted, the Angevin galleys were easily boarded, and 10 were captured, while a force of 7 further galleys under Admiral Bovin were able to skirt the Aragonese and escape the harbor. The battle ended at dusk, with the Angevin fleet scattered or in Aragonese hands.

Angevin casualties were heavy; according to the Muntaner Chronicle, 3500 Angevins had been killed, which some modern sources speculating this number was not overly exaggerated. 860 Angevins were captured, while Muntaner claims that Admiral Cornut was killed in personal combat by Lauria. 10 Angevin galleys were captured, while a 13th century source states that, of the 7 escaped galleys, two had to be scuttled. Aragonese losses were counted at three hundred dead and two hundred injured. The disproportionate casualties between the Aragonese and Angevin forces was due to Aragonese proficiency in ranged combat, coupled with high Aragonese morale and superior ship design.

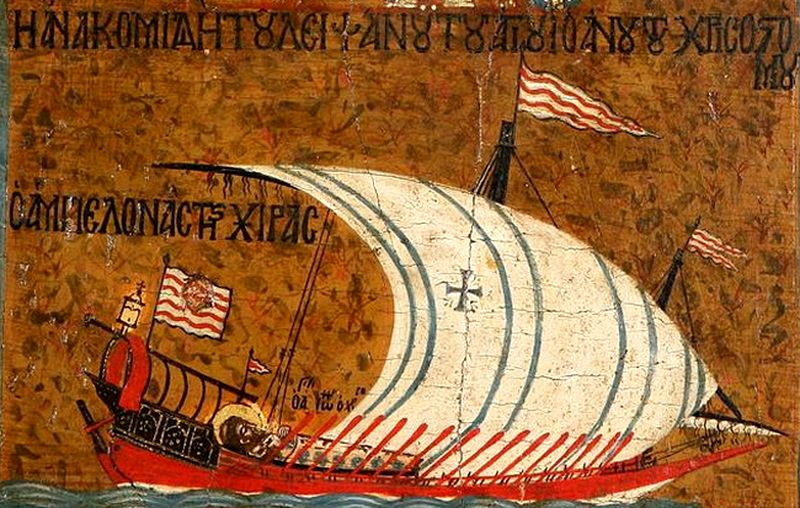
14th-century painting of a light galley, from an icon now at the Byzantine and Christian Museum at Athens

== Aftermath ==
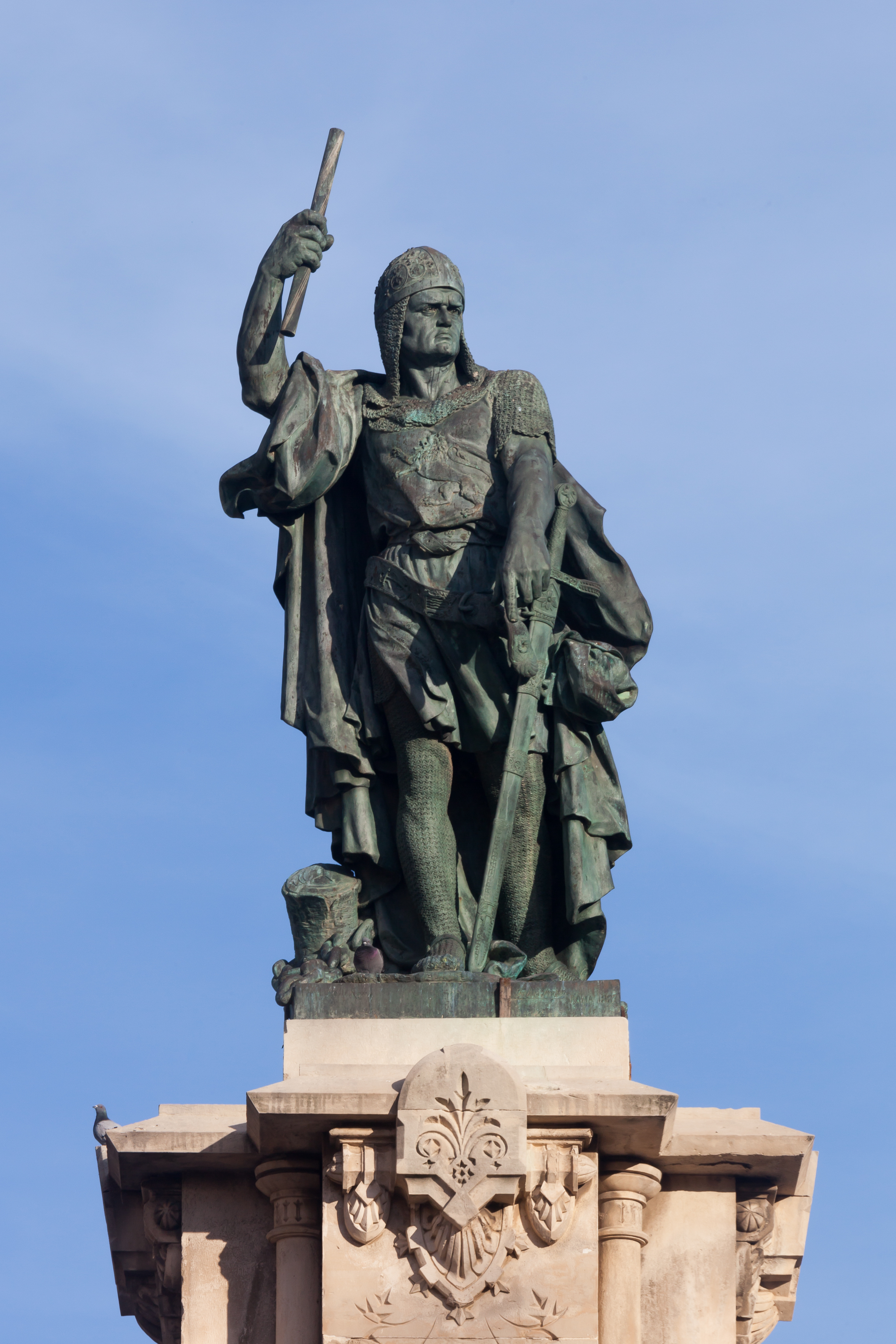
A statue of Roger of Lauria in Tarragona, Spain.

At once, the Aragonese sent an armed barge to Syracuse, to make their victory known, while ten captured Angevin galleys were added to the fleet. Lauria ordered the King's officials in the city to send runners to Messina and to the rest of the Sicily. A captured Angevin fast ship was quickly manned and sent on to Catalonia, to the King of Aragon. Passing by Mallorca and Barcelona, the vessel sent a runner to inform the Aragonese court with the good news.

The Aragonese admiral gave up the King's share and his own right to the booty won by his soldiers, declaring the galleys and the Angevin prisoners to be enough. His soldiers gave Lauria their thanks, and rested for two days.

=== Securing Malta ===
After resting his men for two days, Lauria advanced with his banners raised on the city of Malta. The notables pleaded with him not to do any damage, saying that the city would put itself in the keeping and the command of the King of Aragon, and that Malta would surrender to Lauria. The admiral entered the city with his troops, and received the homage of the city and the island. Lauria left two hundred men to secure and garrison the city against the Angevins in the Castello del Mare. Lauria then briefly attempted to besiege the castle, but finding it impossible without catapults and siege equipment, he was forced to raise the siege.

The notables of Malta gave Lauria one thousand onzas in jewels and precious stones, as well as enough provisions to allow a safe passage to Messina. Then, Lauria set sail for Gozo, attacking the island and taking its ravelin. The city surrendered immediately, and received one hundred Catalan soldiers under the same terms as Malta. The men of Gozo gave jewels to the value of five hundred onzas, and further provisions for the Aragonese galleys.

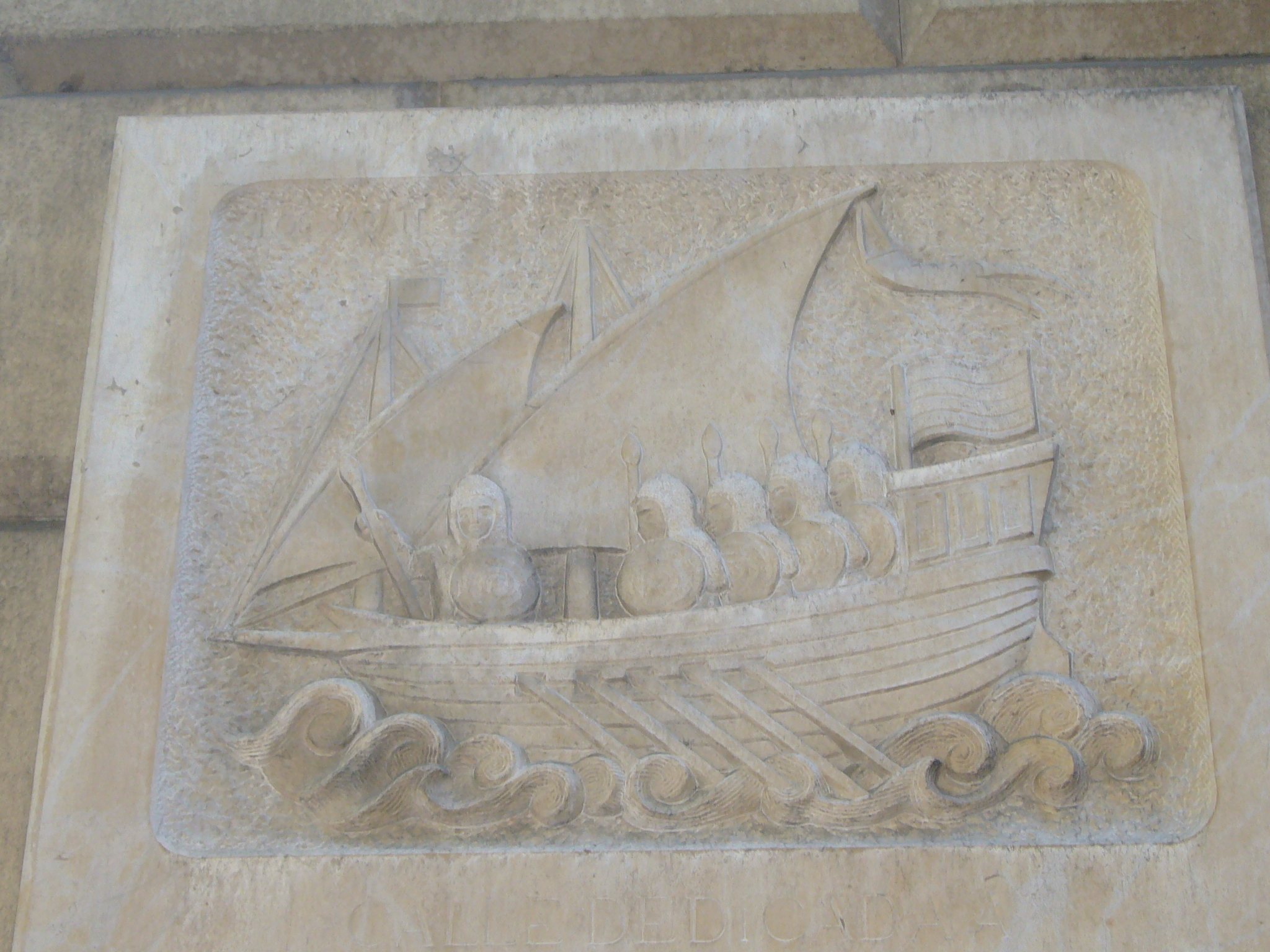
Bas-relief of medieval galley and sailors, in honour of Roger of Lauria, on the facade of Palau Casades, Barcelona.

Setting course for Sicily, the Aragonese fleet landed at Syracuse, and thence to Aci and Taormina. The victorious fleet was celebrated at every Sicilian harbour it landed.

=== Consequences ===
Muntaner asserts that after sharing the victory in Malta, the Aragonese and the Sicilians united themselves in the "bonds of friendship...which is an incontestable proof of good government."

The crushing defeat forced the postponement of Angevin plans to invade Sicily, established Aragonese naval tactic superiority and set the scene for the Battle of the Gulf of Naples in 1284. The Aragonese fleet continued to sail back northwards, and after making a demonstration off Naples, and raiding the neighbouring coast, Lauria attacked and then garrisoned the islands of Capri and Ischia.
