= Battle of Les Formigues =

1285 naval battle near Spain

Coordinates: 41°51′N 3°11′E

- Part of the Aragonese Crusade
Date	September 4, 1285
Location	Formigues Islands, off the coast of Girona, Catalonia, present-day Spain
Result	Aragonese victory

Belligerents
Kingdom of Sicily; Crown of Aragon	France, Republic of Genoa

Commanders and leaders
Roger of Lauria; Ramon Marquet; Berenguer Mallol	Guilhem de Lodeva; Henry di Mari; John de Orreo

Strength
30 galleys 10 galleys	30 galleys

Casualties and losses
Unknown	15–20 or more galleys sunk, burnt, or captured

The naval battle of Les Formigues took place probably in the early morning of 4 September 1285 near Les Formigues Islands, Catalonia, about 85 km northeast of Barcelona, when a Catalan-Sicilian galley fleet commanded by Roger of Lauria defeated a French and Genoese galley fleet commanded by Guilhem de Lodeva, Henry di Mari, and John de Orrea.

There are three almost completely different accounts of this battle: from Ramon Muntaner, Bernard Desclot, and the Gesta comitum Barchinonensium. The Gesta places the battle at Les Formigues (or Fomigas), while Muntaner favoured a location off Roses to the north. Either Lauria or the French were ashore for the night and encountered by the other, or they were both at sea when the encounter took place.

The accounts agree that it happened at night, which was unusual for medieval naval battles, but suited Lauria who was skilled at night-fighting. He used two lanterns on each galley to increase his apparent numbers. Ten to sixteen Genoese galleys under John de Orreo fled, leaving about fifteen to twenty French galleys to be captured, and some others sunk or burnt.

The troubadour Joan Esteve blamed treachery for the capture of the French admiral Guilhem. It is said that three hundred French prisoners were sent back to France. All of the prisoners but one had their eyes gouged out, and that one was left with one eye to guide the others. The prisoners brought one message from Roger of Lauria to the King of France: that not even fish would be able to navigate safely through Mediterranean Sea without a shield or sign of the king of Aragon on them.
