= Angevin invasion of Sicily =

1298–1302 War of the Sicilian Vespers campaign

Angevin Invasion of Sicily
- Part of War of the Sicilian Vespers
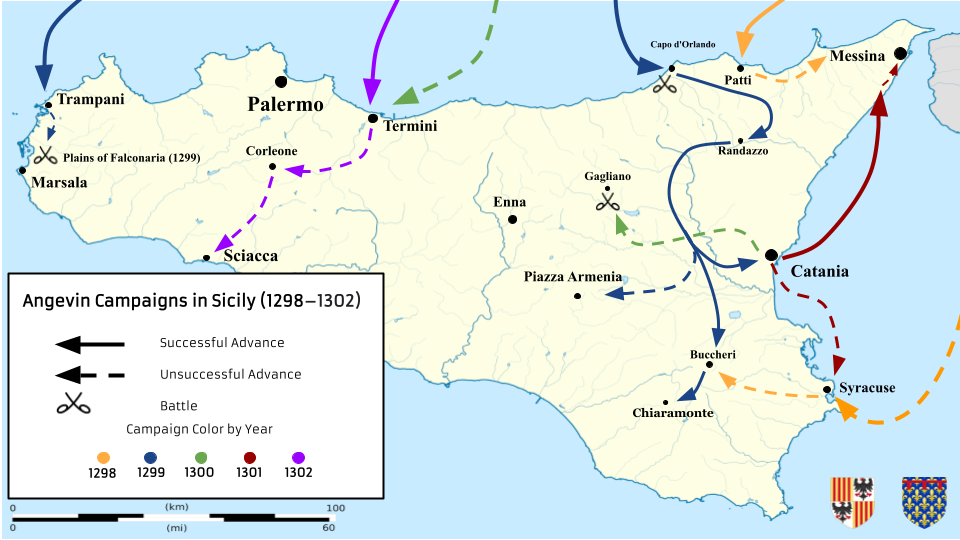
Date	1298–31 August 1302
Location	Sicily, Western Mediterranean
Result	Sicilian Victory; Peace of Caltabellotta

Belligerents
Kingdom of Sicily	Kingdom of Naples; Crown of Aragon; Papal States

Commanders and leaders
(Kingdom of Sicily) Frederick III of Sicily (Kingdom of Sicily) Constance of Sicily (Kingdom of Sicily) Sicilian Parliament (Kingdom of Sicily) Corrado Doria (Kingdom of Sicily) Blasco I d'Alagona (Kingdom of Sicily) Roger de Flor	Charles II of Naples; Robert II of Artois; Robert of Naples; Philip of Taranto (Crown of Aragon) James II of Aragon (Crown of Aragon) Roger of Lauria (Papal States) Boniface VIII (Kingdom of France) Charles of Valois

The Angevin invasion of Sicily (1298–1302) was a military campaign launched against the Kingdom of Sicily by an alliance of the Angevin Kingdom of Naples, the Crown of Aragon, and the papacy during the War of the Sicilian Vespers. Fought in the final years of the 20-year long war, the campaign saw the alliance make some territorial gains on the island before ultimately withdrawing in the face of Sicilian resistance.

Marked by sieges, guerilla warfare, and engagements at sea, the invasion saw the Angevin–Aragonese–Papal allies engage in operations to seize control over major cities in Sicily, with varying degrees of success. However, controlling the Sicilian interior proved to be difficult, and allied control was only consistently established in northeast and southeast Sicily. The failure of the final allied offensive in 1302 directly led to the signing of the Peace of Caltabellotta, the treaty that concluded the War of the Sicilian Vespers.

== Background ==
Starting with the Sicilian Vespers in early 1282, in 1297 the ensuing War of the Sicilian Vespers continued to drag on, with neither side able to find an acceptable peace. Angevin Naples and the papacy remained adamant that Sicily needed to be occupied and returned to the rule of the Angevin House of Anjou, while the Sicilians (led by the newly crowned Frederick III of Sicily) continued to fiercely defend the island's status as an independent kingdom. The Angevins had made small forays onto Sicily during the course of the conflict, most notably when an Angevin fleet had captured Augusta in 1287, but these invasion attempts had all been on a small scale.

To end the stalemate, Pope Boniface VIII conducted an extensive diplomatic offensive to win the Kingdom of Aragon, Sicily's ally from the start of the war, to the Angevin's side, hoping a newly formed Angevin–Aragonese–Papal alliance would be able to force the Sicilians to submit. James II of Aragon, himself the former king of Sicily and brother of Frederick, supported a negotiated peace with the papacy, but was initially hesitant to sign any treaty that would draw Aragon into a war with Sicily. However, after a series of peace overtures to his brother failed, in March 1297 James travelled to Rome to confer with Boniface. In Rome, James negotiated a treaty in which he agreed to make war on his brother and Sicily in exchange for compensation, namely money and a papal sanction to annex Sardinia and Corsica.

With the new alliance secured, Aragon and Angevin Naples prepared to go on the offensive against Sicily in 1298. Aragon possessed a formidable navy led by the famous Aragonese–Sicilian admiral Roger of Lauria, who was himself a former subject of the Kingdom of Sicily, and Angevin Naples had a large, well-equipped army trained in the style of medieval France. In Sicily, Frederick prepared to fight off the allied invasion, quickly working to build up the Sicilian navy. While smaller than the Angevin army, the Sicilian army had years of experience and was a capable fighting force; in addition to native Sicilian soldiers, many Aragonese and Catalans who had served on the island during the earlier campaigns of the war remained loyal to Sicily and joined Frederick's forces.

== 1298 invasion of Sicily ==
In the summer of 1298 a combined allied fleet of 50 Aragonese and 30 Angevin galleys was prepared to operate out of Naples. Opposing the allied fleet were 64 Sicilian galleys led by former Genoese admiral Corrado Doria. Under James' command, the allies needed to secure a stretch of beach on which to disembark an army and a port from where they could resupply. Roger of Lauria commanded the allied fleet, with Prince Robert of Naples (son of King Charles II of Angevin Naples) also serving as an army commander. At Roger's advice, in the summer of 1298 the allied fleet sailed for the north coast of Sicily, where parts of the population had pro-Angevin tendencies; the army made a successful landing at the city of Patti on 1 September, capturing the city without a fight. The allied army moved eastward in the direction of the key city of Messina, soon forcing the towns of Milazzo, Novara, and Monforte San Giorgio to surrender and forming a corridor of allied control in northeast Sicily. However, rugged terrain and a hostile populace forced James to call off the advance on Messina and withdraw to Patti. The operation convinced the allies that a large, sheltered port city needed to be captured before the onset of winter.

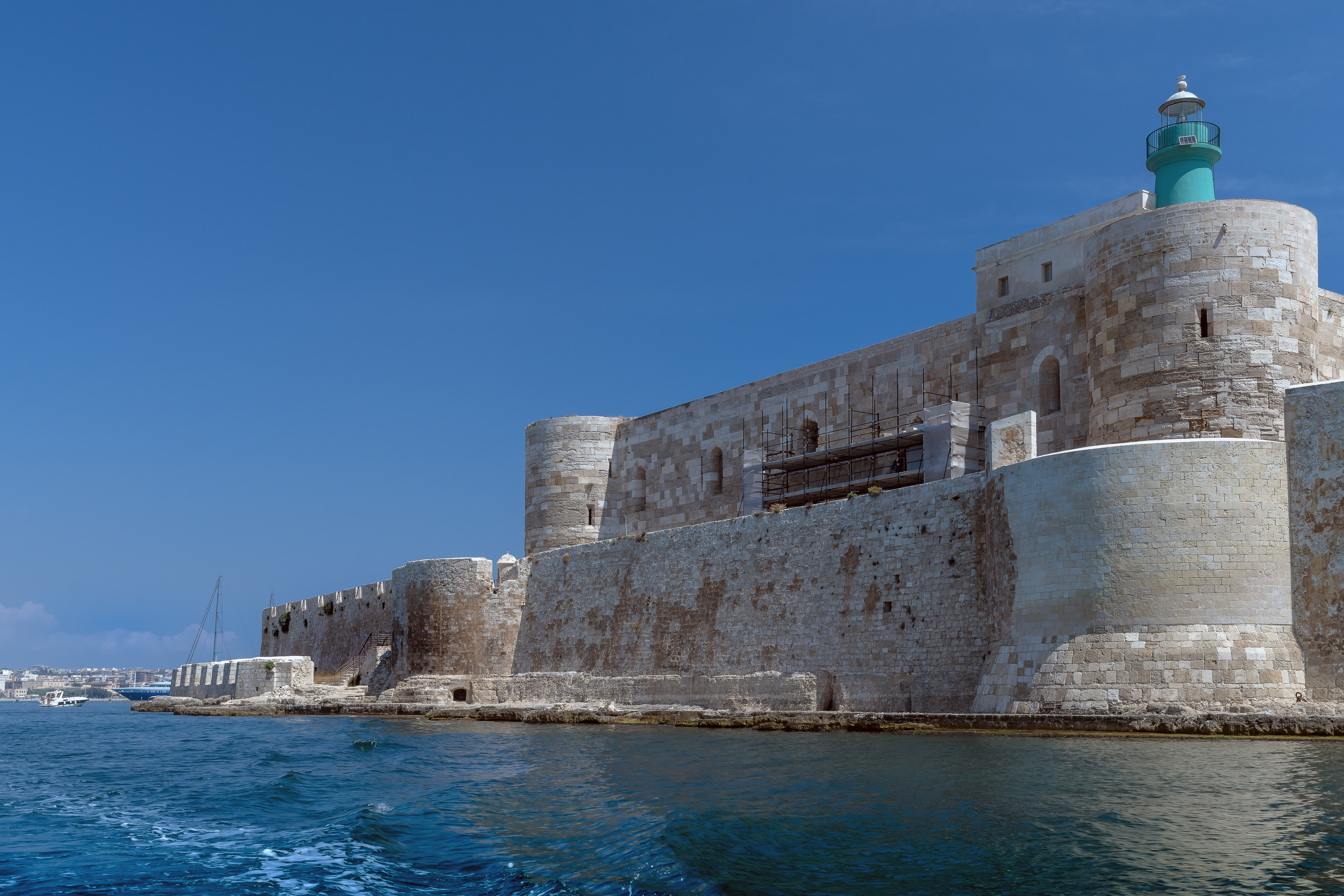
View of the sea fortification at Castello Maniace in Syracuse. Guarding Syracuse's two harbors, the castle proved to be a major obstacle for allied attempts to capture the city. Note the castle pictured was renovated in the 18th century.

In October the allied force sailed from Patti, leaving a substantial garrison behind to occupy the city. James planned to embark on a major campaign to capture Syracuse, a large port in eastern Sicily, and eventually use the port to maintain his fleet through the stormy Mediterranean winter months. The allied army and fleet besieged the city in late October, landing troops to the north and south of Syracuse. However, the heavy-fortified city refused to surrender and Lauria's fleet was unable to take the formidable Castello Maniace by sea. With Syracuse besieged, the allies conducted a limited push inland, capturing the towns of Sortino, Ferla, Palazzolo and Buscemi before an attempt to seize Buccheri was thwarted by armed townspeople. The allied advance quickly dried up and a protracted siege of Syracuse began.

=== Siege of Syracuse ===
While the allies under James besieged Syracuse, Frederick and the Sicilian army took up positions in Catania, some 30 miles north of the besieged city, and began to wage a successful guerilla campaign against the allied army. Frederick dispatched Blasco I d'Alagona, a capable Catalan general in Sicilian service, to strike the allied army. D'Alagona conducted a series of successful cavalry raids against the allies, limiting their ability to move further into the Sicilian interior by harassing their supply lines. Frustrated with the state of the siege and the ongoing Sicilian resistance, the allies looked for ways to gain control over the towns and castles in the East-Central Sicily, hoping to cut the island in two. During the winter of 1298 a Sicilian noble named Giovanni di Barresi attempted to defect to the allied cause, promising to turn over control of his lands in Capo d’Orlando and Pietraperzia—a blow that would effectively allow James to combine his forces in northern and southern Sicily. The Aragonese king dispatched allied soldiers to meet with Barresi and take control over his holdings, but the Sicilians moved faster; Frederick learned of the plot, and d'Alagona's forces ambushed the allied force at night near Giarratana, routing it.

As the winter progressed, both sides suffered heavily from attrition. Disease and lack of supply cut the fighting effectivity of the Angevin–Aragonese allies besieging Syracuse, which continued to put up a stubborn resistance. The allied position in Sicily became more tenuous when a civil uprising broke out in the occupied city of Patti in the north, forcing the allied garrison to retreat to the city's citadel. Not willing to risk losing the city, Roger of Lauria organized two relief forces to aid the besieged garrison; the admiral led a force of 300 horsemen towards the city, while he tasked his cousin Giovanni di Lauria with leading 20 allied ships to Patti. This plan worked, and the combined force convinced the Sicilians to lift the siege of Patti and retreat, but the relief effort also forced the allied fleet to traverse the hazardous coast of Sicily in the turbulent winter weather. On its return trip south Giovanni's fleet was ambushed in the strait of Messina by a larger Sicilian fleet, resulting in the capture of Giovanni and 16 ships—a major loss to the allied navy that also left the Sicilian and allied navies at near-parity in terms of number of ships.

In March 1299, James decided to lift the allied siege of Syracuse. Withdrawing his army and navy, he sailed north for Naples, leaving garrisons behind to hold conquered towns. The Aragonese king extended a tentative peace offer to his brother, suggesting that he would withdraw his forces from the theatre in exchange for the 16 ships and prisoners the Sicilians had taken at Messina. The offer caused some debate in the Sicilian court; some councilors encouraged Frederick to accept the offer, while others wanted revenge on the allies and urged Frederick to continue the war. Frederick ultimately chose to attack his brother's battered force as it withdrew, but a storm covered the allied retreat and prevented a major fleet action. With peace aborted, James returned to Naples and then onto Barcelona, where he replenished his army and navy.

== 1299–1301 invasion of Sicily ==
=== Second landing and Battle of Cape Orlando ===
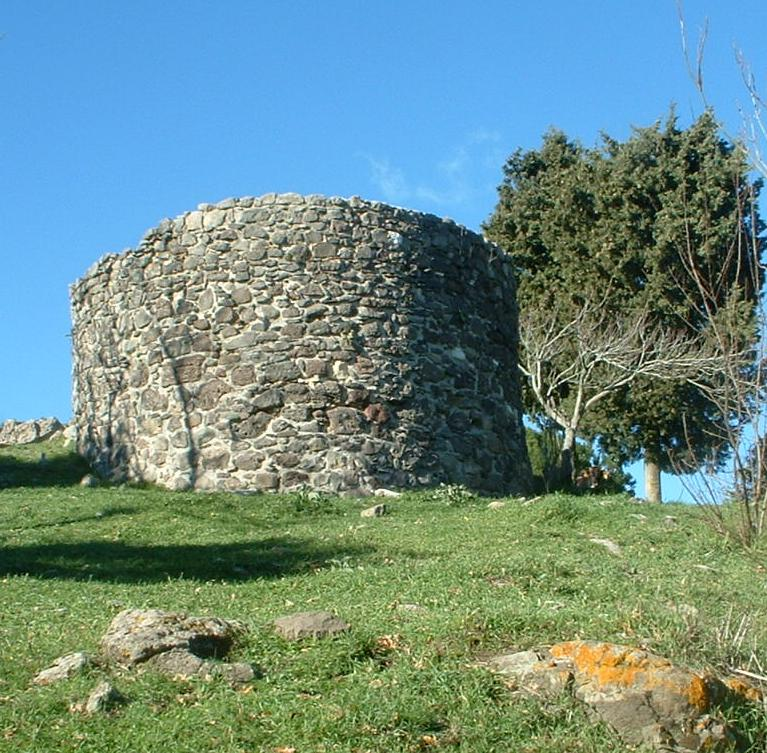
Remains of a Vespers-era fortification in Buccheri. Commanding the hills west of Syracuse and south of Catania, the town resisted the allied invasion in 1298 and surrendered during the allied advance in 1299.

James and his rebuilt army arrived back in Naples in May 1299, and by late June a second allied invasion fleet was ready to depart for Sicily. Frederick and the Sicilians took advantage of the spring to assail and re-capture the majority of the towns occupied by the allies the previous year. In July the Aragonese-Angevin fleet sailed for northern Sicily; although the allied corridor in the north had collapsed the previous year, the allies hoped that enough allied loyalists had escaped into the north of the country and would aid their return. Under Roger of Lauria's command, the allied fleet rounded the Cape of Orlando and landed at the town of San Marco d'Alunzio, which commanded the mouth of the Zappulla River. The allied fleet took up defensive positions on the beach, facing their bows outward towards the sea. Frederick and the Sicilian fleet arrived soon after, intending to intercept the invasion but instead finding the allied fleet already beached and offloading men. Though the Sicilian fleet was outnumbered by the allied fleet, Frederick chose to attack, hoping to smash the allied invasion while he had his forces concentrated. In the ensuing Battle of Cape Orlando on 4 July, the Sicilian fleet suffered a major defeat, losing 18 galleys and granting the allies command of the sea. Frederick was able to escape the battle, but several high-ranking Sicilian nobles were taken prisoner and Sicilian naval power was crippled. James - having been informed of growing unrest in Catalonia - returned to Aragon soon after the victory, leaving Lauria and the Angevins to continue the war in Sicily. Some sources have alleged that James, tired of expending Aragonese resources fighting a fellow member of the House of Barcelona and his former subjects, intentionally shifted his attention back to Iberia and away from Sicily, and James would never return to the theatre. With James' withdraw from the theatre, the weight of forces in the conflict shifted to Angevin Naples and Aragonese forces took a limited role in the campaign.

The success at the Battle of Cape Orlando was a major victory for the Aragonese-Angevin allies. Wary of the allies' beachhead on Sicily and seeing Sicilian naval power crushed, the Sicilian-controlled islands of Ischia, Capri and Procida defected to the allies, a blow to Frederick's prestige as king. From their landing site at San Marco d'Alunzio, an allied army under Roger of Lauria and Robert of Naples moved south towards the north slopes of Mount Etna, planning on cutting through the country all the way to Catania on the southern coast. The army besieged the strategically important town of Randazzo, which commanded the valley between the Nebrodi Mountains and Mount Etna. The town was strongly defended, however, and so the allied army moved past it, skirting the western side of Mount Etna while continuously moving south. As they advanced through the countryside, the allied army persuaded, threatened, or destroyed towns and villages that they encountered; Adrano was occupied without struggle, Paternò surrendered after a 2-day siege, Buccheri (which had resisted the allies the year before) and Vizzini were both threatened into surrendering, and Chiaramonte was burned after it resisted.

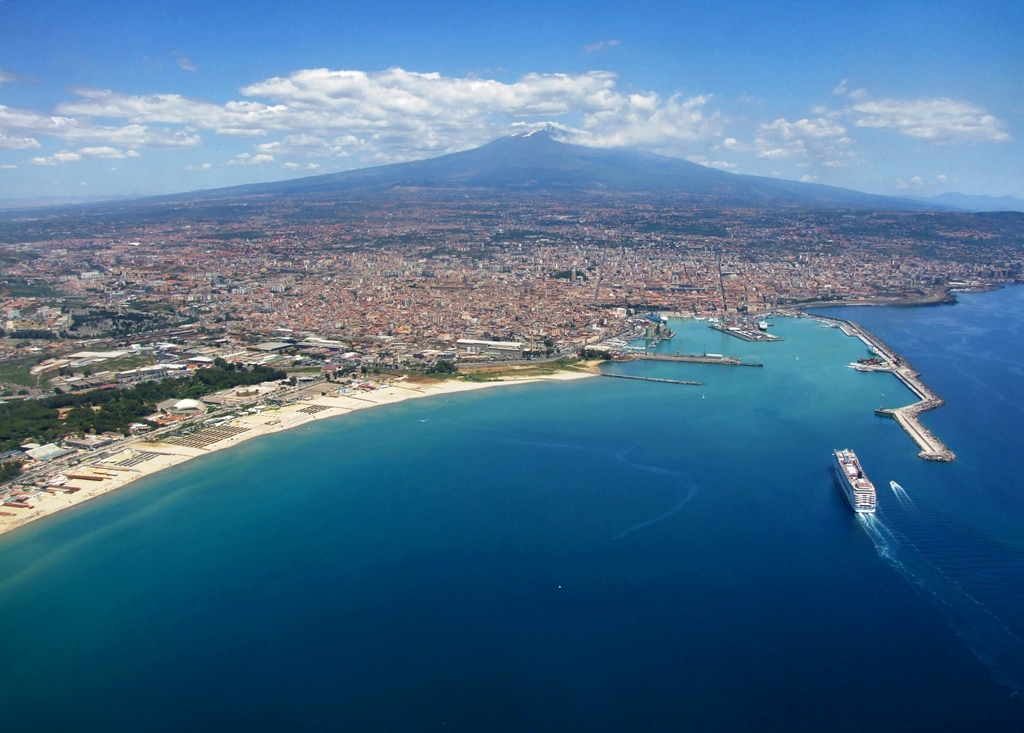
Modern day port of Catania with Mount Etna in the background. A strategically important port, the city was captured by the Angevin–Aragonese alliance in 1299, after which it remained a crucial allied beachhead on the island until 1302.

=== Capture of Catania ===
The allied force approached Catania from the north and besieged the city, long a hotbed of Sicilian resistance to the Angevins. The city was strongly defended, and the garrison commanded by Blasco d'Alagona, so Roger and Robert worked to capture settlements around the city and infiltrate spies into Catania. Soon after the siege began, the allied commanders received missives from a prominent citizen, Virgilio Scordia, offering to turn Catania over to the allies. Scordia and other sympathetic town leaders plotted to foment a popular uprising against the Sicilian government, and then have the allies seize the city in the resulting confusion. Playing along with the plot, the allied army lifted its siege of Catania after only ten days, instead marching to lay siege to Piazza Armerina some 40 miles to the west. Scordia put his plan into action, successfully convincing Frederick and the Sicilian court that d'Alagona was mishandling the governance of Catania. Acting on these rumors, Frederick recalled d'Alagona and replaced him with the less-capable Ugo d’Ampurias. The plotters fomented a popular uprising against d’Ampurias, which succeeded in driving the Sicilian garrison out of Catania—now defenseless, the city was occupied by the allies without a struggle. The allied victory broke the morale of many Sicilian towns in Southeastern Sicily; Buscemi, Ferla, Palazzolo, Cassaro, Ragusa and the city of Noto capitulated to the allies. The only Sicilian victory in the face of the allied advance was at Piazza Armerina, where a Sicilian cavalry force relieved the city and drove off the besiegers.

The loss of Catania was a heavy blow to the Sicilian kingdom, as the allies now possessed a major port in southern Sicily and a landing site in the north. The defeat also forced Frederick to relocate his court, as the new Angevin position in Catania threatened Syracuse and Messina. Though the Sicilians still controlled large parts of the countryside, a string of allied-controlled towns and castles in the interior threatened to cut Frederick off from his capital in Palermo and primary power base in western Sicily. The Sicilian king elected to retreat to the central highlands of Sicily, choosing the heavily-fortified city of Castrogiovanni (modern day Enna) as his base of operations. Frederick's new position in the central Sicilian highlands moved him away from the larger coastal cities, but also strengthened his internal lines of communication, as from Castrogiovanni's commanding plateau he was able to send out forces to counter the allies wherever they chose to attack.

=== Invasion of western Sicily and Battle of Falconaria ===
Having captured Catania and isolated Messina and Syracuse in the east, the allies now prepared an invasion of western Sicily, hoping to catch Frederick's remaining forces in a pincer; if Frederick's army could be destroyed and his capital at Palermo captured, the Sicilian resistance was expected to collapse. To accomplish this plan, in November 1299 an invasion force led by Robert's brother, Prince Philip of Taranto, landed on the northwest coast of Sicily and besieged Trapani. Accompanied by an allied fleet of 50 galleys, the army marched down the western coast of Sicily towards the port of Marsala. Anticipating that Frederick may attack Philip's newly landed army, Robert's army began a march into the Sicilian interior to distract Frederick, while Roger of Lauria's fleet sailed along the southern coast of Sicily, raiding towns.

The landing of the allied army put Frederick and the Sicilians in a difficult position; with Philip landed in the west, Robert pushing from the east, and Lauria attacking from the south, Frederick risked facing enemy attacks on three sides. Many in the Sicilian court advised Frederick to split his army, as they feared that Roger's army in the east would break into the Sicilian interior and attack Castrogiovanni. Frederick, however, decided to concentrate his forces and attack Phillip's western army in force. Forsaking his defensible position, he ordered his army to muster in Calatafimi. On 1 December the Sicilian army encountered Philip's force on the flat plains of Falconaria and attacked. In the battle that followed, the Angevin army was almost completely destroyed and Prince Philip captured, a major victory for Frederick and the Sicilians. The loss of the western army effectively ended the allied campaign for the year, with Roger of Lauria sailing back to Naples to collect reinforcements. Prior to his departure, Lauria counseled Robert not to attack the Sicilians until the spring of 1300.

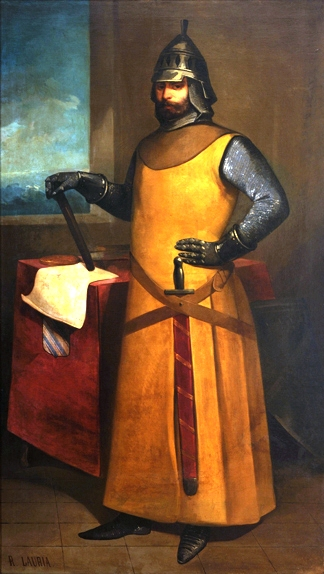
19th century portrait of Sicilian–Aragonese admiral Roger of Lauria. Born in Sicily, Lauria sided with James II of Aragon during the final years of the War of the Sicilian Vespers. An experienced commander, his naval victories at the battles of Cape Orlando and Ponza granted the allies command of the sea.

In the winter of 1299-1300 the Sicilians staged a ploy to entrap an Angevin force in central Sicily. As part of the ploy, a castellan convinced a prisoner (who had been captured at Falconaria in December) that he wished to defect to the allied cause, citing an alleged desire to remain loyal to the pope. The noble was then allowed to leak news of the alleged defection to Robert, to whom the defector offered to open the gates of Gagliano, a strategically important castle less than 30 miles from Frederick's headquarters in Castrogiovanni. Robert took the bait and dispatched an Angevin cavalry detachment to seize the castle, resulting in the ambush and loss of the Angevin force at the Battle of Gagliano in February 1300. Coupled with the victory at Falconaria earlier in the winter, the battle was a boost to Sicilian morale and a setback for the allied campaign in Sicily.

With Sicilian morale bolstered over the winter, resistance to the allies hardened, who found occupying the countryside to be costly. The Angevins hired 400 mercenary cavalrymen from Tuscany to reinforce their forces, but the mercenaries made no progress in suppressing the countryside and withdrew to Catania. A series of bold sorties by small groups of Sicilian ships also disrupted the allies, who nevertheless maintained a superiority at sea. By the spring of 1300, the allied presence on the island was effectively confined to Catania.

Emboldened by their recent successes and seeking to strike another blow against the Angevins, in June 1300 the Sicilians launched a major naval offensive against the Angevins. Under the command of admiral Corrado Doria, a large Sicilian fleet was consolidated and sailed to the gulf of Naples, hoping to defeat the main allied fleet under Roger of Lauria. Outnumbered by Lauria's fleet, Doria hoped that Lauria's Angevin crews would not be able to stand against his more experienced Sicilian crews. When Doria began raiding outlying islands to draw the Angevin fleet out, Lauria chose to attack, and dealt the Sicilians another crushing defeat at the ensuing Battle of Ponza, capturing Doria and scattering the Sicilian fleet. Lauria capitalized on his victory by parading his fleet and prisoners around the coasts of Sicily, showing the Sicilians that the allies retained command of the sea, but this action did not demoralize the island's populace as Lauria had hoped. In the summer of 1300, a raid on Termini by Lauria resulted in disaster as Lauria's raiding party was routed by Sicilian soldiers and Lauria was himself almost captured.

=== Naval expeditions and Siege of Messina ===
Despite successes and setbacks in the previous year, the start of 1301 saw the Angevins capitalize on their naval power and strong position in Catania. Acting on a plan put forward by Lauria, the allied fleet split into two fleets; Lauria led one half to harass the north shore of Sicily and resupply Angevin positions there, while Robert led the other half south to attempt a second siege of Syracuse. Having lost their fleet at Ponza the year before, the Sicilians were unable to counter these movements. However, in July a deadly storm struck both allied fleets, resulting in the loss of nearly 30 galleys. Robert was forced to retreat from Syracuse, while Lauria's fleet successful circumnavigated Sicily and avoided the worst of the poor weather. Regardless, the loss of ships and skilled crews to weather and disease sapped allied naval power, and the abortive attempt to besiege Syracuse also resulted in the loss of several ships.

With any westward movement blocked by Frederick's army in Castrogiovanni, the Angevins chose instead to strike north towards Messina. Despite being strongly defended, the city – fatigued after years of war – was surrounded by a ring of Angevin-controlled castles to the west, Catania to the south, and had no fleet to protect it. In August, Robert and the Angevin army sailed north from Catania, landing several miles outside the city and then pushing to within a mile of the port, while Lauria's fleet established a tight blockade. Famine soon set in, with the city's defenders succumbing to malnutrition and disease.

Needing to relieve Messina, Frederick ordered his army to march against Robert's forces. Led by Blasco d’Alagona, the army moved faster than the allies anticipated, soon taking up positions in the mountain town of Tripi. Seeing that the veteran Sicilian army would now be able to attack him from the high ground around Messina, Robert chose to withdraw his main force from the outskirts of the city, sailing back to Catania while leaving some men behind to garrison the allied-controlled castles in the area. D'Alagona's force entered Messina with some supplies, but the city continued to wither and starve under the allied blockage. Some relief for the city came from the sea when a fleet of privateers led by Roger de Flor began a successful series of raids against Lauria's fleet, allowing for some supplies to trickle into the city by sea. However, the Sicilian position in Messina continued to grow more tenuous as the food situation worsened, with d'Alagona himself dying after eating spoiled rations. The Angevins also began to suffer from lack of food, as the scorched earth campaign they had conducted to starve Messina had also destroyed the farmland the allies used to feed their army and garrisons.

In September, Frederick arrived near Messina with fresh troops and more supplies. Seeking to break the allied siege, he conducted an ambitious overland march through the foothills west of Messina, bypassing allied-held castles and successfully reaching the city with supplies. The king's presence in Messina bolstered the defender's morale, and during his withdraw Frederick's army evacuated the city's women and children, allowing the garrison to further stretch out its food supply. Frederick and his army opened a second resupply corridor in mid-September, bringing more supplies to the city. On his second return from the city, Frederick launched a nighttime raid on the allied held castle at Castiglione, successfully capturing the fortification and breaking the ring of allied positions surrounding Messina.

With fall of Castiglione, the allied ring surrounding Messina was breached and the siege collapsed. While the allies still maintained control over parts of the north coast of Sicily and Catania, the failure of another push inland convinced Robert to seek a peace accord with Frederick. Robert's wife, Yolanda of Aragon, was the younger sister of Frederick and so became an important envoy between the Angevin prince and Sicilian king. Under the terms of the accord, Robert and Roger agreed to withdraw all allied forces on the island to Catania. The war, however, continued as no official peace treaty had been signed.

== Invasion of Charles of Valois ==
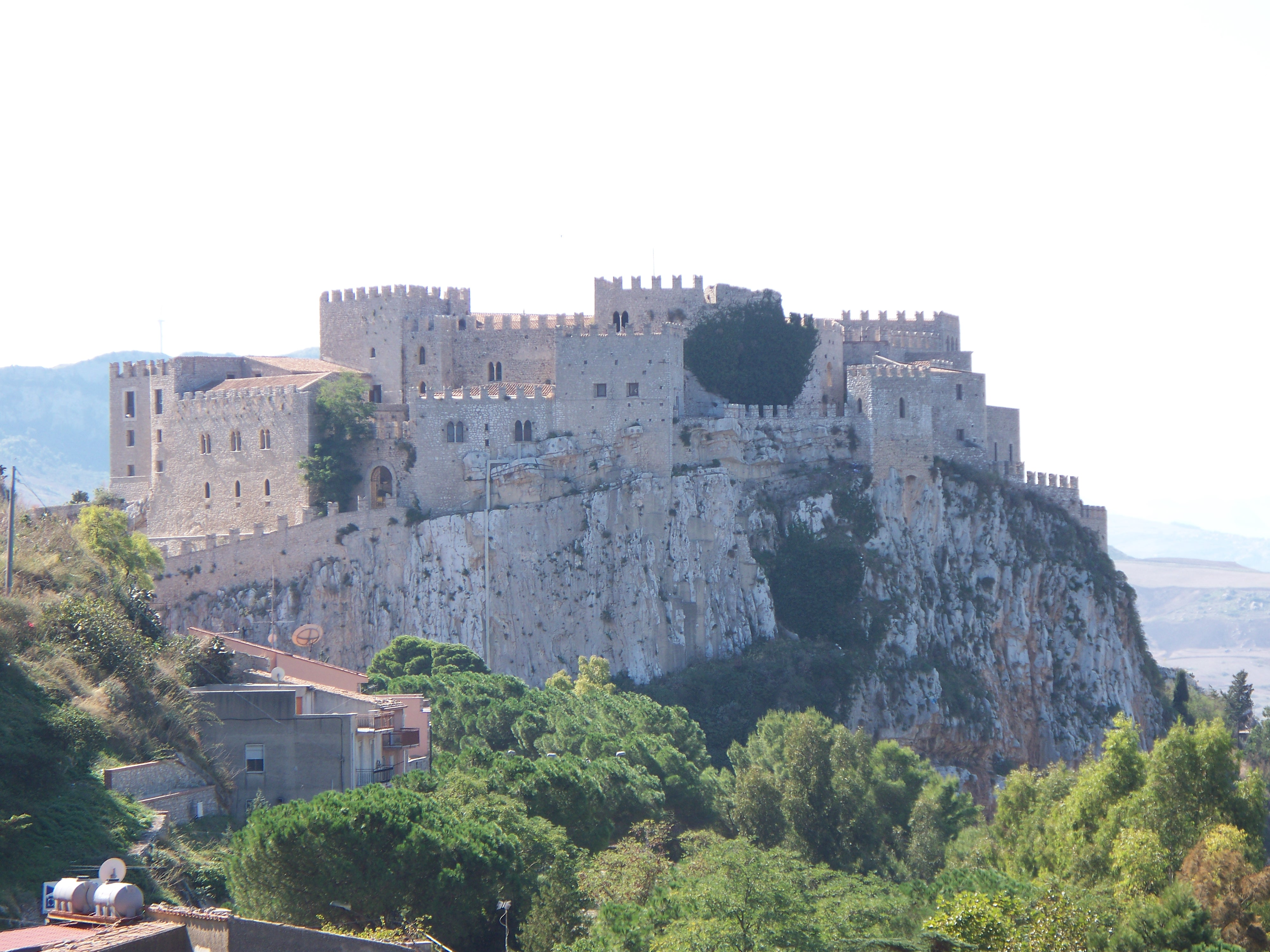
The Castello di Caccamo in Caccamo, western Sicily. Rugged terrain and fortified towns posed a major challenge to invading armies; Charles of Anjou's forces besieged but failed to take the castle at Caccamo, forcing his army to bypass it.

In 1302, Prince Charles of Valois (a veteran of an earlier phase of the War of the Sicilian Vespers, in which France had fought against Aragon in Iberia) marched into northern Italy at the head of an army of feudal levies and mercenaries. Acting as a prince of France, but officially independent of the French crown, Charles was seeking to acquire lands he had legal claim to, as in 1301 he had been declared the titular Emperor of Constantinople through his marriage to Catherine de Courtenay. Receiving significant financial backing from the papacy and his allies in the French nobility, he used his army to crush supporters of the anti-papal Ghibellines in Tuscany and Florence before moving south. Seeing opportunity, and, fearing that Angevin Naples was likely to seek a permanent peace with Sicily after the disastrous siege of Messina the previous year, Pope Boniface approached Charles with offers of land and titles if he were to come to the aid of the papacy in Sicily.

Arriving in Naples, Valois signed an accord with the pope and Angevins pledging to conquer Sicily in their name in return for their support in his forthcoming invasion of Byzantium and Greece. In May 1302, the peace compact between the Angevins and Sicily expired, resulting in the former beginning to offer men and ships to support Valois' planned invasion of Sicily. News of Valois' invasion plans did not stay hidden, and Frederick prepared to fight. Faced with Valois' large and professional French army, Frederick fortified coastal towns and stripped the countryside of food, hoping to wear Valois down in a war of attrition. He and the Sicilians also struck preemptively against allied garrisons near Catania, capturing several towns.

The allied fleet, now laden with Valois' army, set sail at the end of May and landed at Termini on the northern coast, encountering no resistance. While Roger of Lauria raided the coastline near Palermo, the Valois army waited for resupply, giving Frederick time to muster his forces at Polizzi, 20 miles away. Valois began to march inland, but his multi-national army (Frenchmen under Valois, Frenchmen and Italians under Robert, Angevin-loyalist Sicilians, Aragonese, and foreign mercenaries) suffered from a convoluted command structure. The army besieged Caccamo, but found it too well defended and so bypassed the fortress, exposing their rear lines of communication to Sicilian militias. The army then moved on to Corleone, whose population withstood an attempt to storm the town, forcing Valois to lay siege; after 18 days with no success, he ordered the siege lifted and began to move south, leaving another enemy strongpoint to his rear. Cut off from his beachhead in Tremini and surrounded by barren, hostile countryside, Valois elected to march southwest to Sciacca, where he planned to link up with the allied fleet and resupply by sea. As the allied army moved, Frederick and the Sicilians shadowed them through the countryside, choosing not to engage them directly.

Moving through the Sicilian countryside in June, disease, famine, and the hot Sicilian summer devastated Valois' army. The army arrived outside Sciacca in July, where it laid siege to the city. The city resisted the siege, and in late July a nighttime ride by Sicilian cavalry through the allied siege lines allowed for the Sciacca garrison to be reinforced. Seeing Valois mired in siege warfare in front of Sciacca, Frederick mustered his forces in the hills outside the city, preparing to strike a blow to lift the siege; by early August, Valois' army was out of supplies, surrounded in hostile countryside, and encircled by Frederick's growing Sicilian army. Valois' force was still able to fight, but the French prince – still keen on invading Byzantium – was likely hesitant to lose his army in a climactic battle with the Sicilians.

In August 1302, Valois sent envoys to Frederick to discuss peace. The round of negotiations that followed resulted in the Peace of Caltabellotta being signed between Frederick and Charles of Valois on 31 August. The treaty's immediate effects included the withdraw of all allied forces from Sicily (in exchange for the withdraw of Sicilian forces from Calabria) and the release of prisoners. The treaty ended combat between the Sicilians and allies, and upon its ratification by Pope Boniface in 1303 it ended the War of the Sicilian Vespers.
