= Siege of Messina (1301) =

Siege in 1301

- Part of the War of the Sicilian Vespers
Location	Messina, Kingdom of Sicily
Result	Sicilian victory

Belligerents
Kingdom of Sicily	Kingdom of Naples

Commanders and leaders
Frederick III of Sicily; Blasco I d'Alagona †; Roger de Flor	Robert of Naples; Roger of Lauria

Strength
	80 galleys

The siege of Messina was a land engagement in which an Angevin army attempted to besiege the Sicilian city of Messina in 1301. Fought during the final years of the War of the Sicilian Vespers, the siege came after a three-year campaign by an Angevin−Aragonese−Papal alliance to invade Sicily and re-establish Angevin control over the island kingdom. The siege was the second time in the conflict that Messina had been besieged by an Angevin army—the first siege of Messina having failed in 1282.

In the spring of 1301, the Angevins succeeded in surrounding the city and establishing a naval blockade. However, efforts by the Sicilians to resupply the city succeeded, and ultimately the Angevin army was forced to withdraw. The defeat of the siege marked the last major Angevin campaign of the war.

== Background ==
As part of the wider War of the Sicilian Vespers, in 1298 an alliance of Aragon and Angevin Naples invaded Sicily, seeking to return the island to Angevin control. The invasion met with mixed success; the port city of Catania was occupied by the Angevins, but the Sicilians and their newly elected king, Frederick III, continued to mount an effective resistance.

In early 1301 the Angevins planned a new offensive on Sicily with the aim of capturing Messina in the north-eastern corner of the island. A key port city, Messina controlled the titular strait of Messina, and its capture would give the Angevins a second major port to land troops and supplies onto Sicily. In addition, Messina was a potent symbol of Sicilian resistance during the conflict; the city had withstood an Angevin siege in 1282, during the immediate aftermath of the Sicilian Vespers, and so the Angevins hoped that capturing the city would erode Sicilian morale. Messina possessed formidable defenses, but was vulnerable to attack; the city was separated from the rest of Sicily by the Peloritani mountains to the west, making it heavily reliant on food being shipped in by sea, and years of conflict had degraded the city's ability to mount a defense.

== Siege ==
In the August of 1301, an Angevin army led by Prince Robert of Naples sailed north to Messina from the Angevin stronghold at Catania, conducting a naval landing several miles outside the city walls. He attempted to take the city by storm, and succeeded in burning some of the city's harbor facilities, but was not able to take the walls. Over the next several weeks, Robert succeeded in taking control of the countryside outside the city, which was soon ringed with Angevin-held forts and castles. While the Angevin army encircled the city, Aragonese-Sicilian admiral Roger of Lauria, now in the service of Angevin Naples, blockaded Messina with a fleet of galleys.

While the Angevins sailed against Messina, Frederick and the Sicilians moved to counter the Angevin advance. The Sicilians suffered from a lack of funds, equipment, manpower, and moved cautiously; the Sicilian navy had been shattered at the Battle of Ponza the year before, and Frederick was hesitant to use his limited manpower to directly confront the Angevins in open battle. He ordered Blasco I d'Alagona, a capable Catalan captain in his service, to lead a force of 2500 men to relieve Messina. Alagona marched towards Messina by way of Tripi. Upon learning of the approaching Sicilian reinforcements, Robert changed his strategy. Wary that the Sicilians would sweep down from the high ground and attack his army as it besieged Messina, Robert instead dispersed his forces into the countryside, bolstering the defenses of the ring of Angevin-held castles surrounding the city. From these fortifications, the Angevins could send out parties to interdict the supply of food being sent overland into Messina. Robert’s troops also raided the countryside around Messina, laying waste to farms in the hope of starving the city. Alagona’s force reached Messina without incident, reinforcing the garrison with his 2500 men. However, the Angevin effort blockade the city and occupy the countryside proved highly effective—within several weeks, famine had taken hold in the city. In early September, Alagona himself died of food poisoning after eating spoiled rations.

=== Sicilian relief ===
Realizing that the situation in Messina was growing dire, Frederick began to planning new operations to relieve the city. With the majority of his forces needed in Castrogiovanni to block any Angevin movements west, Frederick organized a series of supply caravans, with the intent to send these caravans through the mountains to resupply Messina. He also supported the plans of Roger de Flor, a Sicilian-German privateer in his service, to sneak small, heavily-laden supply ships through Roger of Lauria’s naval blockade into Messina.

The war in north-eastern Sicily turned into a grinding attritional campaign; the Sicilians would attempt to send caravans of supplies along the narrow roads and mountain passes to Messina, while the Angevins would send raiding parties out from their strongholds to stop them. In early September, Roger de Flor was able to organize a small flotilla of resupply ships in southern Sicily. Using the hot summer winds blowing from north Africa, he and his flotilla quickly dashed along the coast to Messina, slipping through the Angevin blockade with valuable provisions for the city. Later in the summer, Frederick personally led a relief caravan through the mountains to the outskirts of Messina, bringing more valuable supplies to the defenders. The physical presence of their king greatly improved the morale of the Messinese population, and upon his exit from Messina, Frederick evacuated many of the city's women and children. On his march back west, Frederick launched a nighttime attack on the Angevin-held castle at Castiglione, capturing the castle and thereby breaking the ring of Angevin fortifications surrounding Messina.

By the autumn of 1301, the siege continued to drag on. While Messina suffered from food shortages, the resupply campaign by the Sicilians had staved off famine and allowed the city to continue to resist the siege. In addition, the early Angevin actions to deprive the countryside of food now ensured that the Angevins had difficulties feeding their own men besieging Messina. Faced with a continuing series of small-scale Sicilian attacks and a campaign of naval raiding by Roger de Flor's fleet of privateers, Robert of Naples decided to lift the siege and withdraw to Catania.

== Aftermath ==
The Angevin attempt to besiege Messina was a costly setback for the Angevins. With the withdraw from Messina, Angevin control over Sicily was now limited to Catania. The defeat of the siege showed that, despite the Angevin's crippling of the Sicilian fleet the year prior, the Sicilians retained the ability to resist Angevin armies in eastern Sicily. At the urging of Yolanda of Aragon, Robert entered into peace negotiations with Frederick. With the permission of his father, Robert and his wife sailed to Syracuse to ratify the treaty with Frederick in person.

The second siege of Messina was the last major attempt by Angevin Naples to re-establish control over Sicily during the war. A second major invasion of Sicily would come the following year, when a French army led by Charles of Valois landed in Sicily, but also failed to establish control over the island.

== Legacy ==
Efforts by a Messinese priest, Albert of Trapani, to feed the poor of Messina during the siege were noted. Prayers by Albert for food and deliverance were credited as having lifted the siege, and Albert was canonized as a saint in 1476.

The siege was recorded in the contemporary Chronicle of Muntaner.

== Sources ==
- Goodenough, Lady (1921). Chronicle Of Muntaner.
- Stanton, Charles D. (2019), Roger of Lauria (c. 1250–1305): 'Admiral of Admirals', Woodbridge: Boydell & Brewer, ISBN 978-1-78327-453-6
