= Gagliano Castelferrato =

Gagliano Castelferrato Gagghianu (Sicilian)
- Comune
- Comune di Gagliano Castelferrato
- View of Gagliano Castelferrato

- Location within Italy Location within Sicily
- Coordinates: 37°43′N 14°32′E
- Country: Italy
- Region: Sicily
- Province: Enna (EN)

Government
  - Mayor: Salvatore Zappulla

Area
  - Total: 56.24 km^{2} (21.71 sq mi)
- Elevation: 651 m (2,136 ft)

Population (2026)
  - Total: 3,111
  - Density: 55.32/km^{2} (143.3/sq mi)
- Demonym: Gaglianesi
- Time zone: UTC+1 (CET)
  - Summer (DST): UTC+2 (CEST)
- Postal code: 94010
- Dialing code: 0935
- Patron saint: St. Catald
- Saint day: 31 August
- Website: comunegaglianocastelferrato.en.it

Gagliano Castelferrato (Sicilian: Gagghianu) is a town and comune (municipality) in the province of Enna in the autonomous island region of Sicily in Italy. It has 3,111 inhabitants.

The town was the site of the Battle of Gagliano in 1300 during the War of the Sicilian Vespers.

== Demographics ==
As of 2026, the population is 3,111, of which 48.3% are male, and 51.7% are female. Minors make up 13.1% of the population, and seniors make up 29.3%.

Historical population

Year	Pop.	±%
1861	3,861	—
1871	4,056	+5.1%
1881	4,605	+13.5%
1901	5,128	+11.4%
1911	4,161	−18.9%
1921	4,324	+3.9%
1931	4,247	−1.8%
1936	4,601	+8.3%

Year	Pop.	±%
1951	5,075	+10.3%
1961	4,846	−4.5%
1971	4,459	−8.0%
1981	4,172	−6.4%
1991	4,173	+0.0%
2001	3,772	−9.6%
2011	3,722	−1.3%
2021	3,344	−10.2%

Source: ISTAT

=== Immigration ===
As of 2025, immigrants make up 3.7% of the total population. The 5 largest foreign countries of birth are Germany, Romania, United States, Brazil, and Lithuania.
