= Battle of Gagliano =

- Part of War of the Sicilian Vespers
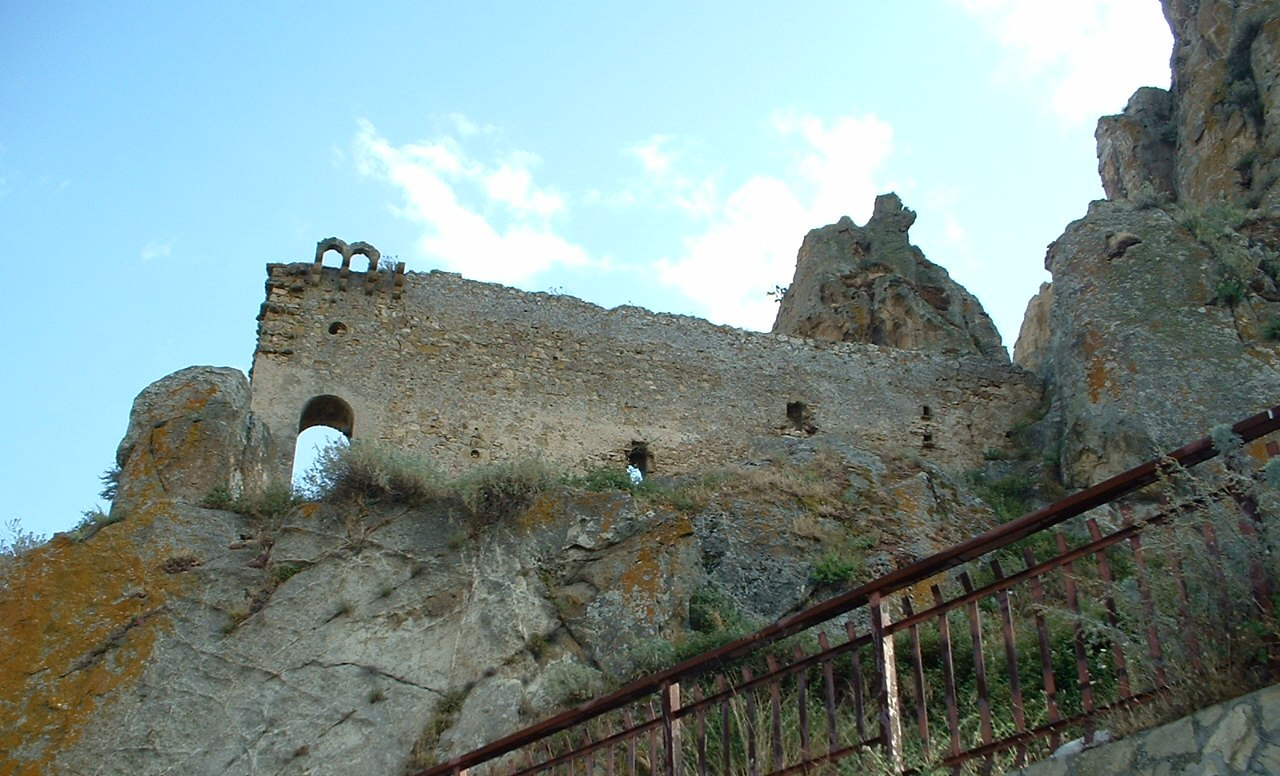
- Ruins of the castle at Gagliano, the fortress targeted by the Angevin advance prior to the battle.
Date	February 1300
Location	Gagliano Castelferrato, Kingdom of Sicily
Result	Sicilian victory

Belligerents
Kingdom of Sicily	Kingdom of Naples

Commanders and leaders
(Kingdom of Sicily) Blasco I d'Alagona	(Kingdom of Naples) Walter V, Count of Brienne (POW)

Strength
200 knights 300 light infantry (almogavars)	300 knights 200 horsemen

Casualties and losses
22 horsemen 34 infantry	Heavy

The Battle of Gagliano was a military engagement between the forces of the Kingdom of Sicily and the Angevin Kingdom of Naples. Fought in early 1300 during the War of the Sicilian Vespers, the battle involved the entrapment and routing of a Angevin heavy cavalry detachment by a Sicilian force near the fortified town of Gagliano Castelferrato in central Sicily.

== Background ==
After years of war (starting with the titular Sicilian Vespers in 1282), in 1299 an alliance of Angevin, Aragonese, and papal forces began to conduct a successful land campaign on the island of Sicily. Led by Aragonese–Sicilian admiral Roger of Lauria and Angevin prince Robert of Anjou, the allied army moved throughout eastern Sicily, attacking cities and towns in an attempt to erode Sicilian resistance. Despite fierce resistance by the Sicilian royal army, by the summer of 1299 the allies had captured the key Sicilian city of Catania, cutting off the major Sicilian cities of Syracuse and Messina in the east while also forcing Frederick II of Sicily to retreat into the Sicilian heartland. Planning on attacking Frederick's remaining forces from both sides, in the fall of 1299 an Angevin army landed at Trapani, seeking to march inland while the allied armies in the east marched west. This approach ended in disaster when in November 1299 the western Angevin army was routed at the Battle of Falconaria. The defeat of the western army caused Roger of Lauria to sail for Naples to procure more men and supplies, leaving Robert to command the Sicilian campaign; before departing, Roger advised Robert to hold off attacking the Sicilians until the spring of 1300.

In early 1300 an Aragonese castellan named Montaner di Sosa started a plot to entrap the Angevins. As part of the plot, di Sosa convinced a prisoner (a French noble named Charles Morelet, who had been captured at Falconaria in November) that he wished to defect to the allied cause, citing his desire to remain loyal to the pope. The noble was then allowed to leak news of di Sosa's alleged defection to Robert, to whom the supposed defector offered to open the gates of the castle of Gagliano. Robert received the intelligence and summoned a council of war to discuss a plan to seize Gagliano; the castle was a tempting target, as it was located close to Frederick's Sicilian army headquarters in Enna. Robert considered leading the attack in person but, heeding the advice of his Aragonese wife that the surrender may be a ruse, placed a junior commander in command.

== Battle ==
In February 1300 a mounted force of Angevin knights and mercenaries under the command of Walter V, Count of Brienne were ordered to secure the surrender of Gagliano. Walter's mounted force was composed of young Angevin-French nobles, many of whom had lost family members in the nearly 20-year long war of the vespers. According to the contemporary Muntaner Chronicle, the nobles referred to themselves as the "Knights of Death" and had vowed vengeance on Sicily for their slain relatives. The total force numbered 300 men of the Knights of Death, complemented with 200 mounted men-at-arms. The Sicilians shadowed the advancing force, setting up watches in the mountainous approaches to Gagliano.

When the force arrived a Gagliano, they founded that the castle had not opened its gates. They were quickly confronted by 300 Sicilian knights (likely ethnic Catalans loyal to Frederick) and 300 almogavars, the elite light infantry of Catalonia and Aragon. The Sicilians deployed their infantry in a double-lined 'V' formation in the hills, forcing the Angevins to attack them in disadvantageous terrain. At dawn, the Sicilian infantry sparked their weapons against the rocks before launching waves of deadly throwing spears into the Angevin ranks. The almogavars defied chivalric tradition, ignoring the heavy-armored Angevin knights and instead killing their horses. With the Angevins now disoriented, the Sicilian cavalry charged downhill, routing them. Groups of Angevin knights attempted to hold out on rocky outcroppings, but were gradually captured or killed, with Walter being among the prisoners taken.

=== Aftermath ===
The battle resulted in the routing and destruction of the Angevin force; few of the horsemen made it back to friendly territory. Sicilian casualties were light. The second major Sicilian victory in the winter of 1299–1300, the battle and its outcome raised Sicilian morale.
