= Blasco I d'Alagona =

Aragonese nobleman and soldier

Blasco I Alagona
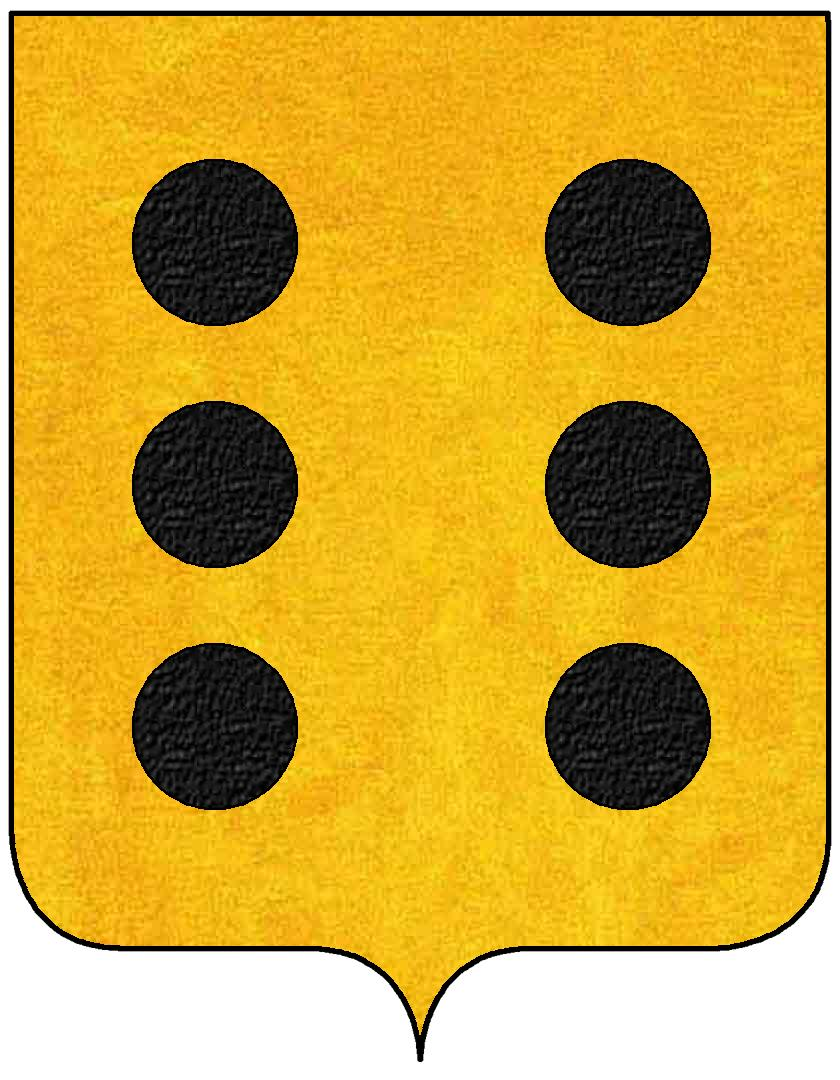
- Born: 13th century Aragon
- Died: 1301
- Military career
- Allegiance: Kingdom of Aragon; Kingdom of Sicily
- Rank: General
- Conflicts: War of the Sicilian Vespers; Battle of Gagliano; Siege of Messina †

Blasco I Alagona or d'Alagona (died 1301), called the Elder, was an Aragonese nobleman and soldier in the service of the Kingdom of Sicily after 1285. His family was originally from Alagón. As a military commander, he was noted for his adept use of mobile infantry against heavy cavalry.

== Biography ==
Blasco was born in the first half of the 13th century. He probably served Peter III of Aragon (died 1285) in the conquest of Sicily (1282), since he was already established there in November 1285, when he witnessed the sale by Peter's heir, Alfonso III, of his right to Sicily to his brother James. He was entrusted with important military and administrative tasks by James. In 1291, he captured Montalto in Calabria and made its Neapolitan commander, Guidone da Primerano, a prisoner. At the end of the year, he was summoned to Aragon by James, who had succeeded Alfonso in the interim, to answer charges of embezzlement. He returned to Sicily and was preparing another campaign when he was recalled a second time to Aragon in 1294. When James renounced his claim on Sicily in the Treaty of Anagni the following year (1295), Blasco left his court without permission and returned to Sicily.

In 1296, Frederick III, who had been proclaimed king by the Sicilians in opposition to the Treaty of Anagni, appointed Blasco a captain in the army. He took part in the king's invasion of Calabria later that year. When James returned to Sicily he left Blasco as his lieutenant in Calabria. In 1297, Blasco was recalled to Sicily under suspicion of treason but was quickly sent back. The Neapolitan admiral Roger of Lauria having occupied Catanzaro in the meantime, Blasco led a small force against the city in the latter half of September and, although outnumbered, won a major victory. In January 1299, Frederick rewarded Blasco for his service with the castle and lands of Naso, confiscated from the traitors Giovanni and Matteo Barresi.

At the Battle of Capo d'Orlando (4 July 1299), in which Frederick's navy defeated a combined Neapolitan–Aragonese fleet trying to enforce the Treaty of Anagni, Blasco's actions were credited with saving the king's flagship. At the Battle of Falconaria (1 December 1299), he commanded the left wing and was given credit for the victory. In 1300, his infantry defeated the Neapolitan cavalry at the Battle of Gagliano, capturing Walter V, Count of Brienne. The following year he died during the Siege of Messina, possibly from consuming rotten food.

== Sources ==
- Giunta, Francesco (1960). "Alagona, Blasco, il Vecchio". Dizionario Biografico degli Italiani. Vol. 1. Rome: Istituto dell'Enciclopedia Italiana.
