= War of the Sicilian Vespers =

Conflicts between various European kingdoms (1282–1302)

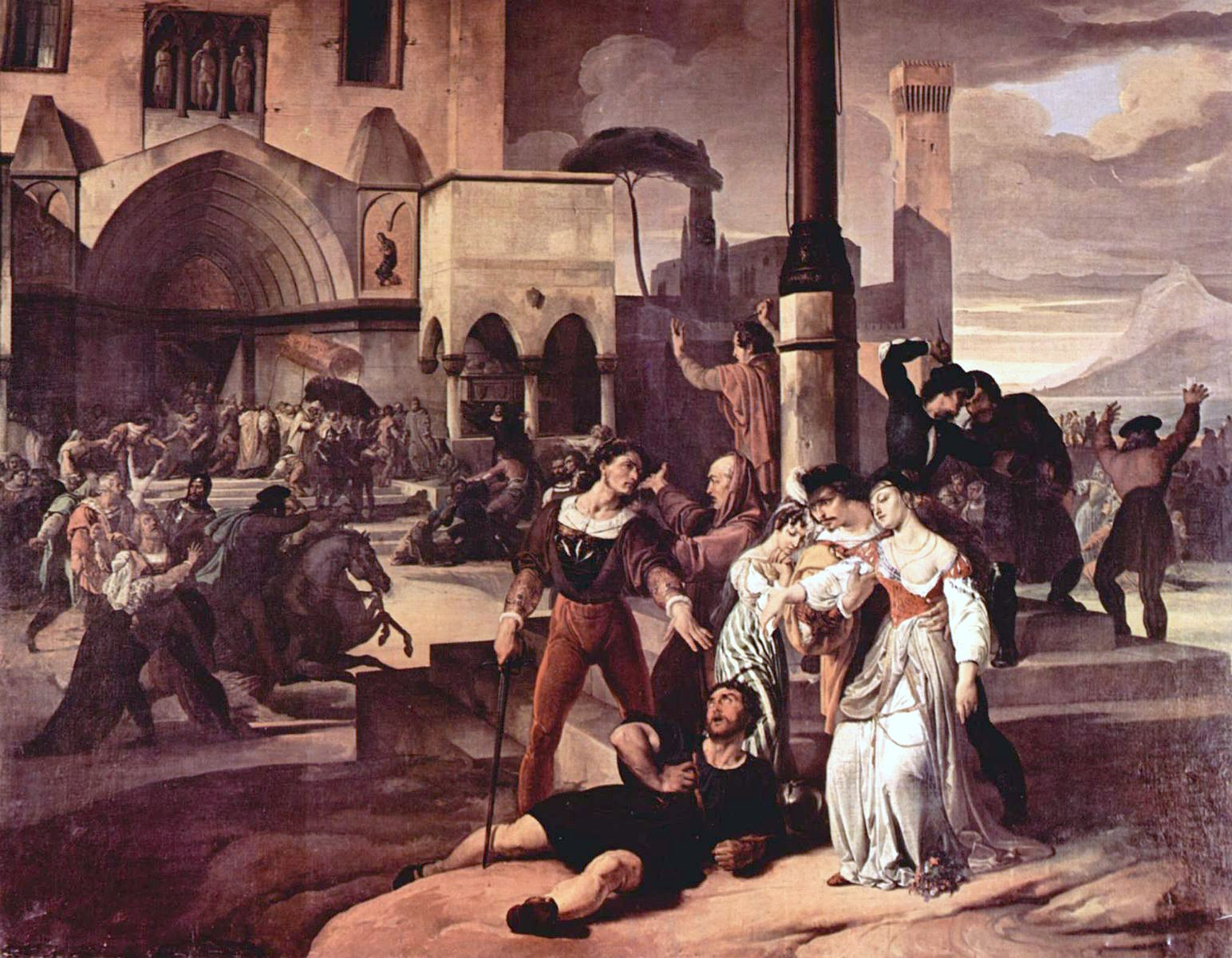
- A scene of the Sicilian Vesper by Francesco Hayez
Date	30 March 1282 – 31 August 1302
Location	The Mediterranean; primarily Sicily, the Mezzogiorno, Aragon, and Catalonia
Result	Peace of Caltabellotta, House of Barcelona gains Sicilian throne
Territorial changes	Division of the pre-war Kingdom of Sicily into Trinacria (insular Sicily) and Angevin Kingdom of Naples; Aragon gains suzerainty over the Kingdom of Majorca; Aragon gains claim on Corsica and Sardinia; Papacy cedes right to name king of Sicily; Frederick III agrees to pass throne to House of Anjou upon death (later reneges)

Belligerents
Crown of Aragon; Kingdom of Sicily; Supported by: Byzantine Empire; Republic of Venice; Hafsid dynasty Ghibellines	Kingdom of Naples; Kingdom of France; Kingdom of Mallorca; Kingdom of Navarre; Supported by: Republic of Genoa; Papal States; Kingdom of Castile; Crown of Aragon (post 1295 Treaty of Anagni); Guelphs

Commanders and leaders
Crown of Aragon: Peter III of Aragon (1282–1285) # Alfonso III of Aragon (1282–1291) # James II of Aragon (1291–1302); Kingdom of Sicily: James II of Sicily (1285–1295); Frederick III of Sicily (1296–1302); Constance of Sicily; Sicilian Parliament	Angevin Naples: Charles of Anjou (1282–1285) # Charles II of Naples (1285–1302); Robert II of Artois (1282–1302); Kingdom of France: Philip III of France (1284–1285) # Philip IV of France (1285–1290); Independent French Princes: Charles of Valois (1284–1302); Kingdom of Majorca: James II of Mallorca (1283–1295)

The War of the Sicilian Vespers, also shortened to the War of the Vespers, was a conflict waged by several medieval European kingdoms over control of Sicily from 1282 to 1302. The war, which started with the revolt of the Sicilian Vespers, was fought over competing dynastic claims to the throne of Sicily and grew to involve the Crown of Aragon, Angevin Kingdom of Naples, Kingdom of France, and the papacy.

Initially fought between Sicilian rebels and Charles of Anjou in Sicily and Southern Italy, the war expanded when Peter of Aragon intervened in Sicily to support the rebels and claim the throne. After Aragonese successes, the war grew into the concurrent Aragonese Crusade as the Kingdom of France intervened against Aragon in Iberia. The crusade ended in defeat, but efforts to end the war failed despite several peace treaties. Aragon gave up the crown of Sicily in exchange for papal concessions in 1297, entering into an alliance with Angevin Naples and the papacy against Sicily, but the new alliance's campaign to invade Sicily saw no success. The war ended in 1302 in the Peace of Caltabellotta, by which Sicily became an independent kingdom ruled by the House of Barcelona.

Marked by intermittent land engagements, decisive battles at sea, siege warfare and political maneuvering, the war resulted in the division of the old Kingdom of Sicily; the island of Sicily came to be ruled as the Kingdom of Sicily (Trinacria) under the House of Barcelona, while the Southern Italian territories of the former kingdom became the Kingdom of Naples, ruled by the House of Anjou. The Vesperan conflict led to an era of Aragonese expansion in the Western Mediterranean, as the kingdom gained suzerainty over the Kingdom of Majorca and Sardinia. Outlasting four kings and four popes, the twenty-year war showcased the decline of papal power in southern Europe and the rise of increasingly powerful kings in the late 13th century.

== Background ==
=== Swabian Sicily and Papal opposition ===
The island of Sicily had been ruled as a kingdom since the early 12th century, when Norman lord Roger II of Sicily conquered the island and established the Kingdom of Sicily. Strategically located in the Mediterranean, the kingdom grew to include much of southern Italy, and was considered one of the wealthiest kingdoms in Europe. Grain produced in the kingdom's lands in Sicily and southern Italy fed the northern Italian city states and the Holy Land, while the island itself served as a staging ground for several crusades. Sicily was key to the defense of Rome and the papal states, and as such the papacy considered it vital that a friendly king occupy the throne of Sicily. Diplomatic relations between the papacy and Sicily were heavily intertwined; the papacy funded the Norman invasion of Sicily, had sanctioned the establishment of the kingdom, and the king of Sicily officially ruled as a vassal in the name of the pope.

In the 13th century, Sicily became the heartland of the Hohenstaufen empire of Frederick II of Swabia. Frederick and the papacy bitterly disagreed on issues of papal authority, and his rule resulted in a violent flare-up of the centuries long conflict between the pro-pope Guelphs and pro-imperial Ghibellines. Frederick's lands in Sicily and the Holy Roman Empire surrounded the papal states, and thus trapped the Pope between the metaphorical German hammer and Sicilian anvil.

Following Frederick's death in 1250, the Sicilian kingdom entered a period of political disarray. Frederick's inheritance passed his rule over Sicily and Germany, as well as the title of King of Jerusalem, to his son Conrad IV of Germany, but the new king was unable to immediately establish a base of power in Sicily. After securing his control over Germany in 1251, Conrad decided to invade Italy to claim his father's former lands, but died while campaigning the same year. With Conrad's death, an illegitimate son of Frederick, Manfred of Sicily, was named as regent of the Sicilian Kingdom, as Conrad's son, Conradin, was too young to rule. Like his father, Manfred quarreled with the pope over his legitimacy as ruler of Sicily. A bitter campaign of diplomatic maneuvering, punctuated by open war, began between the papacy and Manfred's Sicilian kingdom.

Seeing the opportunity created by Manfred's contested claim to the throne of Sicily, in the 1250s the papacy used a number of methods to challenge Manfred's power; most notably, the pope began to look for a potential claimant to overthrow him. An army of crusaders, acting in the name of the papacy and Prince Edmund of England, invaded Manfred's northern lands in 1253, but were defeated by the Sicilians in 1254. Capitalizing on his successes against the papacy and the Guelfs, Manfred crowned himself king of Sicily in 1258, and reached the apex of his power after the 1260 Battle of Montaperti.

However, Manfred's rule over the Sicilian kingdom was not without controversy in insular Sicily; Manfred's court was located in Naples, and his ambitions were largely focused on the Italian mainland as opposed to the island. Various cities on the island of Sicily refused to recognize Manfred's rule, and the royal government in Naples struggled to maintain its administration over the island. Several cities declared themselves free communes under the rule of the papacy, which eagerly supported Sicilian resistance as a means of undermining Manfred.

=== Conquest of Sicily by Charles of Anjou ===
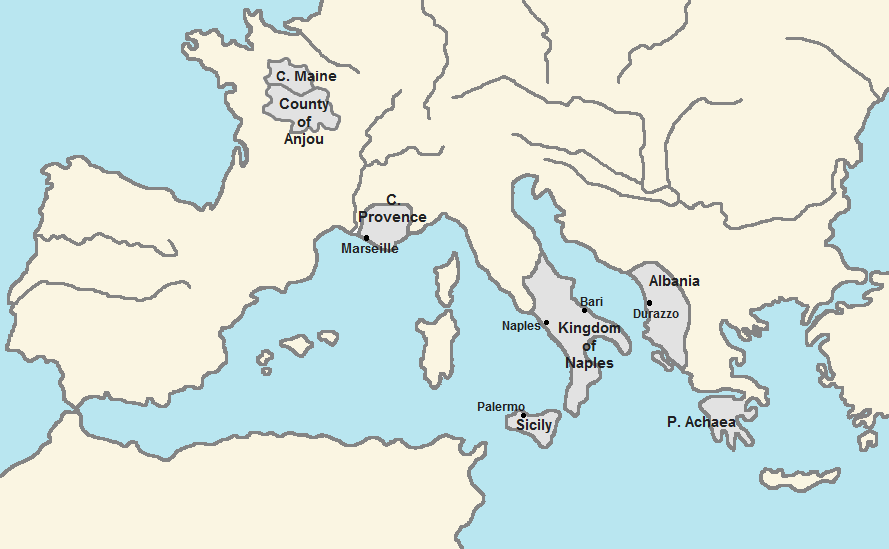
Lands ruled by Charles of Anjou (Charles I of Naples) in the early 1270s. Charles' holdings in France, Italy, and the Balkans made him a major power in the Mediterranean, with some sources describing his state as an 'Angevin Empire'.

At papal invitation, in 1265 the kingdom of Sicily was invaded by Charles I of Anjou, a powerful member of the French royal House of Capet. With political and financial support from the papacy and a coalition of Guelf-aligned Italian cities, Charles conducted a quick advance through Italy. Manfred was drawn into a battle at Benevento and killed, and Charles' victory allowed him to establish the Angevin Kingdom of Sicily and Naples, giving him control of Sicily and most of southern Italy. Some of the Sicilian population welcomed Charles' new regime, as Manfred's decade-long conflict with the pope had been costly for the kingdom. However, Charles' proclivity to centralize power around his throne led to resentment against the new, foreign king.

Using the conflict between the Guelphs and Ghibellines as a political wedge, the victorious Charles expanded his influence throughout Italy, cobbling together a formidable feudal state and forcing treaties on many Italian cities. With the Italian Ghibellines left leaderless and the Holy Roman Empire paralyzed by the Great Interregnum, resistance against Charles was scattered, and he was able to establish the Angevin kingdom as the great power in Italy. The papacy heavily benefited from the Angevin conquest, as the usurping of Manfred's throne by Charles ensured a papal ally ruled over Sicily, and Manfred's death deprived the anti-papacy Ghibellines of one of their greatest supporters in Italy.

While Charles was consolidating his rule over southern Italy, he faced a foreign competitor; in 1268 Duke Conradin of Swabia, a grandson of Frederick II and nephew of Manfred, claimed the crown of Sicily and invaded Italy with a multinational army. The invasion sparked most of Sicily to revolt against Charles, before Conradin was defeated and captured by the Angevins at the Battle of Tagliacozzo. In the aftermath of his victory, Charles - ignoring objections from the pope - had the sixteen-year-old Conradin beheaded, extinguishing the Hohenstaufen line and earning Charles the outrage of much of Western Europe.

==== Angevin administration in Sicily ====
With his immediate foes in Italy defeated, Charles cracked down on the rebellion in Sicily, executing many of the rebel leaders and sacking the city of Augusta. Whereas the island had been relatively untouched during Charles' conquest in 1265, Charles' retaliatory campaign in 1268 led to major disruptions in Sicilian society.

Charles began a new administration in Sicily that would better serve his interests; land confiscations were carried out to deprive Sicilian noblemen of their power, Frenchmen were given preferential status in government, Angevin garrisons were established on the island, and the capital of Sicily was moved from the traditional capital Palermo to Naples, where Charles held court. Charles did not visit the island after 1271, instead governing over the island via intermediaries, which was seen as a slight by some Sicilians, who had traditionally been able to petition the king in person.

Charles followed his political purge of Sicilian society with harsh economic measures. The old Sicilian tax system—developed during centuries of Islamic, Byzantine, and Norman rule—had traditionally offered many exceptions to taxes, and was replaced with a stricter taxation system which only offered tax exemptions for those of French origin, or those Sicilians who had ingratiated themselves with the Angevin–French officials. A new class of tax collectors, almost exclusively of French origin, was established to collect taxes in Sicily. The streamlining of the taxation system provided the Angevin government with ample financial resources, but the taxation changes and mass confiscation of fiefs from defeated Sicilian nobles caused economic chaos in Sicily.

The invasion, revolt, crackdown, and subsequent changes in Sicilian society displaced much of the Sicilian noble class, with many of the exiles fleeing to the Kingdom of Aragon in Iberia. Sources disagree (Note: Sources differ on the effectiveness of Charles' rule over Sicily, and over the extent of the often-discussed Angevin crackdown on Sicily after the island revolted against Charles in 1268. Sources also discuses whether Charles' actions were designed to punish Sicily, or rather to incorporate Sicily into the Angevin empire, likely a degree of both. Abulafia (2000) argues that early modern histories of the Sicilian Vespers were written during a time of intense political friction between Sicily, Naples, and the culturally French House of Bourbon-Two Sicilies, and so 19th century Sicilian historians often placed heavy emphasis on Angevin-French tyranny.) on the effectiveness of Charles' rule, and if his policies constituted tyranny. However, the consensus remains that Charles' ambitious—and often extractive and heavy-handed—re-ordering of Sicilian society bred resentment against Angevin rule.

==== Planned Angevin expansion ====
With Sicily and Naples under his control, Charles and his Capetian relatives in France were able to greatly increase French influence in the western Mediterranean. Seizing on Sicily's wealth and strategic location, Charles planned to use the island as base to project Angevin power. From 1272 to 1276, the Angevin kingdom fought against the Republic of Genoa after Charles detained Genoese merchants in his territory, while also sending troops to drive Ghibelline supporters out of Siena, Pisa, and Tuscany.

Alongside his older brother, King Louis IX of France, Charles launched the Eighth Crusade against Tunis in 1270, using Sicily as a logistical base for the crusader army. While expensive, unsuccessful, and resultant in the death of Louis, the crusade demonstrated the value of Sicily to Charles' plans of Mediterranean expansion. However, the crusade also devastated the Sicilian economy; Sicilian men were conscripted into the crusader army, while ships and supplies were forcibly requestioned by the scattered Angevin, French, and English armies hosted on the island. Charles recognized the harm done to Sicily and the Angevin government extended tax relief to southern Sicily, but the damage done to the island embittered the Sicilian population.

In addition to his campaigns in Italy, Charles of Anjou planned to extend his control eastward into Greece, Byzantium, and the Levant. The decline of the French-dominated Latin Empire had left a scattered realm of French-controlled lands in Greece—referred to as the Frankokratia—without a powerful overlord, and Charles made plans to assume this role. For much of the later 1270s, Charles worked to prepare a large-scale invasion of Byzantium—these preparations were concentrated in Eastern Sicily and in Southern Italy, and while they stimulated the local economies there, the additional taxes raised to fund this campaign caused outrage in western Sicily. Charles had a longstanding ambition to act on the 1267 Treaty of Viterbo, which nominally gave him and his heirs the right to conquer large parts of the Byzantine Empire, and in 1271 he seized control of Corfu and costal Albania.

The papacy, originally a staunch ally, was critical of Charles' growing power in Italy and his strict rule over Sicily. However, it also saw the Angevin kingdom as a powerful tool to be used against the Byzantines and as a means to defend the Holy Land, and so a series of popes financially supported Charles' military buildup in the 1270s. Charles' rule over Sicily also allowed for an era of increased French influence over the College of Cardinals, ensuring that Angevin-French interests were supported by the papacy. Charles was also elected Senator of Rome and imperial vicar of Tuscany, and appointed officials to govern parts of the former city in his name, thus securing a solid base of political power for the Angevin kingdom.

=== Aragonese−Franco rivalry and Aragonese interest in Sicily ===
Under James I of Aragon (reigned 1213–1276), the Crown of Aragon had engaged in decades of military and commercial expansion in Iberia and the western Mediterranean. Aragon's seizure of the Balearic islands in 1232 and conquest of Valencia in 1238 opened the way for Aragonese influence to expand eastward, and James soon set his sights on Sicily and Tunis. Seeing the Sicilians as the key to expanding Aragonese power eastward, James signed a treaty of alliance with King Manfred of Sicily in 1262, sealing the treaty by marrying his son and heir Peter to Manfred's daughter, Constance of Sicily.

The Crown of Aragon and its ruling House of Barcelona were firm rivals of Charles of Anjou; Charles' first wife, Beatrice of Provence, was a member of the House of Barcelona, and Charles' marriage to her gave the Angevin ruler claim to lands the Aragonese kings claimed as theirs. When Beatrix died in 1267, Charles claimed her lands as his own and incorporated them into his growing domain, infuriating James of Aragon and his sons.

James was outraged by Charles of Anjou's invasion of Sicily and the subsequent killing of Manfred and Conradin. He felt further threatened when the French and Angevin-led Eighth Crusade invaded Tunis (which had traditionally paid Aragon tribute) in 1270, seeing the crusade as an Angevin-French attempt to curb Aragonese influence. James died in 1276 and his son ascended to the throne as Peter III of Aragon. Peter was adamant that his wife Constance was the rightful queen of Sicily; he entreated Philip III of France to force his uncle Charles to turn Sicily over to Constance, but this effort failed. Faced with a powerful France to the north and an aggressive Angevin kingdom to the east, Peter made efforts to strengthen his kingdom throughout the 1270s and 1280s, building up the Aragonese navy, reforming the army, and embarking on a diplomatic campaign to isolate the Angevins from potential allies.

==== Sicilian exiles in Aragonese service ====
A notable number of political exiles—driven out of Sicily, Tunis, and the Ghibelline cities of Northern Italy—joined the Aragonese, with many seeking revenge against the Angevins and the recovery of their former lands.

Several members of the Sicilian di Lancia family, which had its familial lands sequestered by Charles, entered Aragonese service (and would later become commanders in the royal army), while a young Roger of Lauria (a future Aragonese admiral) also fled to join the Aragonese court.

Also among the Sicilians who fled to Aragon was diplomat and physician John of Procida. A loyal supporter of first Manfred and then Conradin, John fled to Aragon after Charles' conquest of Sicily, and by 1279 had impressed Peter enough to be granted lands in Aragon. John became a contributing voice in Aragonese foreign policy.

== Sicilian Vespers ==
By the end of 1281, unrest in Sicily was growing rapidly. Muslim victories against Christian fiefdoms in the Levant were destabilizing the Holy Land, and it became widely speculated that Charles and the Angevins would soon sail to invade Byzantium; both of these occurrences sparked fears of a renewed campaign of forced conscription and taxation in Sicily. These fears were seemingly confirmed when in December 1281, Charles ordered a 50 percent increase in the traditional subventio generalis tax for the coming year, which mandated the populace pay or enter military service.

On Easter Monday 1282, just prior to the start of evening Vespers at the Church of the Holy Spirit in Palermo, a deadly riot broke out between Angevin soldiers and the Sicilian population. Accounts differ as to what sparked the riot; some sources note the harassment of a Sicilian woman by an Angevin soldier, others cited an attack by a Frenchman on a Sicilian burgher or priest. The rioting spread throughout Palermo, and soon evolved into an organized revolt against the Angevin—French authorities. Starting in western Sicily, the revolt spread to the rest of the island, leading to the massacre of four thousand Frenchmen over the course of the next six weeks.

Rebels took control over most of the island, with only the key port city of Messina remaining under Angevin control. The home port of the Angevin crusader fleet, Messina was less willing to join the revolt without careful consideration. The city was ringed with Angevin garrisons, was geographically close to Charles’ capital in Naples - it had benefited economically from Charles' aggressive shipbuilding program, and Messina had remained loyal to Charles during the failed revolt of 1268. Inside the city, Angevin vicar Herbert of Orléans initially maintained control; however, as the rebellion spread, unrest in the city grew. Hoping to bolster the city's defenses, in April Herbert sent Angevin troops to reinforce the mountain forts that circled Messina, but this action backfired and emboldened the increasingly pro-rebel populace. Fearing an imminent civil uprising, on 28 April, Herbert and the Angevin garrison withdrew to the castle of Mategriffon, leaving the city to the rebels. Captain of the People Alaimo da Lentini took command of the city on behalf of the rebellion and rioters burned the Angevin crusader fleet stationed in the harbor.

=== Immediate aftermath & International reaction ===
The outbreak of the rebellion in Sicily greatly set back Charles' ambitions in the Mediterranean. Irreplaceable men, ships, and military supplies were lost in the Vesperan revolt, and the loss of Sicily deprived the Angevin government of a quarter of its annual tax revenue. To stabilize the situation, Charles was forced to retreat from his other military commitments in the region, withdrawing troops from Greece and Albania, and recalled his vicar from Jerusalem.

The revolt destabilized the Angevin kingdom, and so the enemies of Charles quickly worked to take advantage of the crisis. In Aragon, John of Procida worked to garner support for the rebels and rally the enemies of the Angevins. Contemporary chronicles and folk legends claim John travelled to Sicily, Constantinople, and Rome to stir up support for the revolt in Sicily, while more modern sources note these claims were likely exaggerated or a complete historical inaccuracy. (Note: Migliazzo (2022) notes that the first recorded mention of John of Procida being connected to the Vespers revolt is found in a 1303 chronicle of the revolt, and only mentions Procida as being in a secondary role. The first account to directly tie Procida to a conspiracy regarding the revolt is dated to 1322. Migliazzo argues that the mendicant orders of Northern Italy, in particularly the Dominican Friars, were leaders in spreading conspiracies about Procida, as the orders were predominately pro-Guelph.)

Byzantine Emperor Michael VIII Palaiologos, a staunch enemy of Charles of Anjou, supported the revolt as it destroyed Charles' ability to invade Byzantium, though the extent of the Byzantine role in the revolt is debated. In Rome, the reaction of the papacy to the Sicilian revolt was split; some members of the church (specifically those cardinals and papal officials from Italy) felt that Charles and the Angevins were growing too powerful, and so considered the Sicilian revolt an opportunity to check Angevin power. However, Pope Martin IV was of French origin and a staunch ally of Charles, and so the resources of the papacy were leveraged against the Sicilians.

While his enemies maneuvered, Charles struck back at the rebels, raising an army of some 31,000 men in Calabria. Crossing the Strait of Messina, Charles laid siege to Messina, hoping to capture the city and use it as a bridgehead to reconquer the rest of Sicily. While the Angevins prepared their counterattack, the various factions that made up the Sicilian rebels remained politically divided; some cities supported independence, others supported Peter of Aragon and his wife Constance, while others requested papal protection. The papacy, however, rejected diplomatic overtures and threatened excommunication for rebels that did not surrender to Angevin authority, thus inadvertently driving many Sicilians into the pro-Aragonese factions. The arrival of the large Angevin army on Sicilian shores and the start of the siege of Messina also convinced many Sicilians that the island needed a strong overseas ally, namely Aragon. The leading cities of the island formed a parliament, which would go on to serve as the de facto government of Sicily.

== Aragonese intervention in Sicily ==
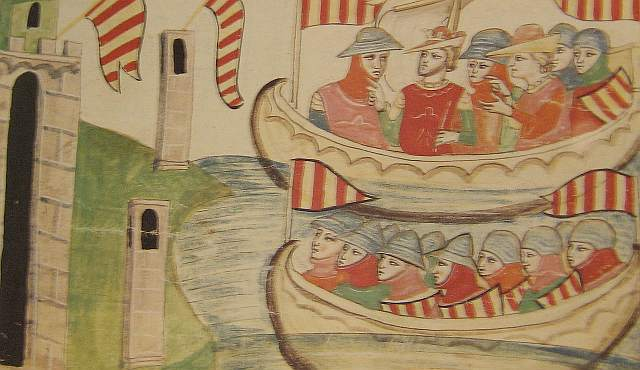
Peter III of Aragon disembarks at Trapani, a miniature from the Nuova Cronica of chronicler Giovanni Villani

=== Opening moves ===
Soon after the Vespers revolt, the rebel-aligned Sicilians turned to Peter of Aragon for support against the Angevins and French. Peter's claim to the Sicilian throne through his wife Constance, along with heavy pressure from wealthy Aragonese merchant communities, made an Aragonese invasion of Sicily a potentially profitable enterprise for Peter. In addition, depriving Charles of the Sicilian throne would weaken the Capetian dynasty and France, which Aragon struggled against in northern Iberia. According to one source, Peter likely intended to invade Sicily once Charles sailed to invade Byzantium, regardless if a revolt had erupted in Sicily or not. After ten weeks of preparation and, using the prospect of a crusade as cover, Peter's fleet of 140 ships sailed for Collo in Ifriqiya.

The Aragonese fleet landed in Collo, occupying the city after a brief siege. Peter soon received envoys from the Sicilian rebels and the papacy. The Sicilian envoys offered Peter the crown of Sicily if he were to defend the island, while the papal envoys inquired why Peter had sailed from Aragon with a heavily armed fleet, threatening Aragon with censur if it interfered with Sicily. Peter accepted the offer of the Sicilian throne, while informing the papal envoys that he was still planning on crusading in North Africa—a cover story he continued to use as his fleet sailed towards Sicily.

Peter and his fleet then sailed for Trapani, landing unopposed before marching to Palermo to be crowned. In early October, Aragonese troops forced Charles to lift his siege of Messina and the remaining Angevin forces abandoned the island. The failed siege of Messina blunted Angevin Naples' military strength, and a month later an Angevin fleet was defeated by the Aragonese navy at the Battle of Nicotera, another blow to Charles. Though Sicily was lost, Charles' forces still controlled significant territories on mainland Italy, and decidedly pro-French Pope Martin IV excommunicated the Sicilian rebels, the Byzantine emperor and the Ghibellines of northern Italy in November. Most significantly of all, the pope excommunicated Peter of Aragon and his ruling House of Barcelona, depriving them of the Aragonese crown and giving the crown of Aragon to Charles of Valois, son of King Philip III of France and grandnephew of Charles of Anjou.

=== Aragonese successes and Angevin counterattack ===
With the expulsion of Angevin forces from insular Sicily, fighting shifted to mainland Angevin territories, namely Calabria in Southern Italy. Charles of Anjou—unsure of the loyalty of his southern Italian subjects—retreated to Naples to reorganize, while the Aragonese-Sicilian army massed in Eastern Sicily. Aragonese troops led by prince James of Aragon landed on the Italian mainland, marching toward Reggio without resistance, but no large uprising against Charles took place in wider Calabria. The Aragonese pressed their advantage and by February 1283 he had taken most of the Calabrian coastline.

On the defensive, Charles sent letters to Peter demanding they resolve the conflict by personal combat. Peter accepted and Charles returned to France to arrange the duel. Both kings chose six knights to settle matters of places and dates. A duel between monarchs was scheduled for 1 June 1283 at English-ruled Bordeaux – one hundred knights would accompany each side, and Edward I of England would adjudge the contest. However, the English king, heeding a papal order forbidding the duel, refused to take part. Peter left Sicily and returned via his own kingdom to Bordeaux, which he entered in disguise to evade a suspected French ambush. No combat between the two took part, and Peter returned to Barcelona to stabilize his kingdom, while Charles returned to Naples to rally support in his southern Italian lands. Wary of future revolts, Charles convened a general assembly of notables in his kingdom, ultimately deciding to lower taxes in Italy. This strategy, however, forced the Angevin kingdom to incur a massive deficit.

While Peter and Charles had been pursuing justice by duel in France, their respective kingdoms continued to fight in Italy. With the war on land stalemated, naval warfare between Angevin and Aragonese fleets took precedence. In 1283 Sicilian–Aragonese admiral Roger of Lauria rose to prominence, replacing Peter's son James as the leading Aragonese naval commander. Lauria raided the Calabrian coast and the bay of Naples, striking at Angevin supply lines, while also keeping up a strong naval presence around Sicily to block any attempt by the Angevins to invade the island. In the summer of 1283, an attempt by an Angevin fleet to relieve Malta was intercepted and defeated by Lauria at the pivotal Battle of Malta, securing Aragonese control of the sea around Sicily.

Despite the string of defeats in the previous year, in 1284, Charles of Anjou prepared to launch a major counteroffensive against the Aragonese. Drawing on the resources of his feudal holdings in France, the Balkans, and Italy, Charles slowly amassed a large army in southern Italy. To make the crossing into Sicily possible, he began a massive Angevin naval buildup, raising fleets in the various French and Italian ports under his control; to fund the fleet, he borrowed money from Italian cities, received a financial stipend from the papacy, and re-established heavy taxation in his lands. Having seen his fleet fail to prevent the Aragonese conquests of Sicily and Malta, he replaced his admirals and captains with new men, who he hoped would be more capable, and hired mercenary ships from Genoa and Pisa to supplement his forces. By the summer of 1284, Charles had amassed a fleet of 200 ships, against the Aragonese fleet of 40–50 ships under Lauria. The Angevin fleet was scattered between several different ports, however, and so Charles waited for an opportunity to consolidate them. Notably absent from Charles' campaign was significant support from the Guelf-controlled cities of Italy. These cities had contributed to Charles' invasion of Sicily in 1266, but they considered his 1284 war against Aragon and Sicily to be an internal matter that did not concern them.

While his fleets amassed in France and Italy, Charles leveraged his diplomatic weight to further his war against Aragon. He convinced the papacy to grant him ecclesiastical tithes—collected by the church to fund a crusade in the Holy Land—for use in his war against the Aragonese, temporarily stabilizing the massive Angevin war debt. Acting in conjunction with his nephew, Philip III of France, he influenced France to prepare for war with Aragon, hoping to draw the Aragonese away from Sicily. This plan worked; Peter of Aragon, wary of a French invasion of Catalonia, was forced to withdraw his army and much of his navy from Sicily, thus greatly weakening his position there.

Seeking to head off the looming Angevin invasion, Lauria led his diminished fleet in a campaign of raiding in southern Italy. In June 1284, the raids provoked Prince Charles of Salerno, son and heir apparent of Charles of Anjou, to lead his fleet—stationed in Naples' harbor—to confront Lauria. In the ensuing Battle of the Gulf of Naples, Lauria inflicted a heavy defeat on Charles' navy and took the prince and 12 ships captive to Messina. The defeat was a major setback for Charles, but not a fatal one, and the Angevins still possessed a numerical advantage in ships. Marching south with an army, in August 1284 he besieged Reggio, sending a fleet to simultaneously blockade Messina and distract Lauria. The siege failed, however, and Lauria drove away the blockading fleet after it was damaged in a storm. Lauria followed up his breakout with a series of strikes on Charles' supply lines, eventually forcing the Angevin army to withdraw to Foggia. With his victories, Lauria had retained Aragonese control of the sea. The huge costs incurred by the naval buildup and aborted land campaign depleted the Angevin treasury—crippling debt, and the unexpected series of Aragonese victories, forced Charles to halt his counterattack until 1285.

Though it maintained control over Naples and much of Southern Italy, the Angevin Kingdom lacked the funds to continue the counter offensive against Aragon, and with his son's capture, Charles had lost his heir. Charles fell ill and died at Foggia in early 1285, while Aragonese attention was diverted towards a brewing war with France in Iberia. With Charles dead and Peter distracted, Sicily became a secondary theatre in the conflict until the late 1280s.

== French intervention and Aragonese Crusade ==
=== Border conflict and politics ===
In light of Aragonese successes against the Angevins in Sicily, France looked to support its dynastic ally and take advantage of the conflict. The court of Philip III was split on war with Aragon, for while the pope had granted the Aragonese crown to a French prince, war would be costly. Philip had vowed that an attack on Charles' Angevin kingdom in Sicily would be treated as an attack on France, but the French nobility showed a reluctance to become involved and Philip was unable to respond to the Aragonese landing on Sicily in 1282. By early 1284, however, Philip had amassed enough political support to declare war; while he had little interest in Sicily itself, he saw value in seizing Roussillon and Montpellier, and in helping save his uncle Charles from defeat. Philip also hoped to expand his influence in northern Spain by securing the Val d'Aran and the Kingdom of Navarre, which were under his protection as per the Treaty of Orléans and nominally ruled by his son, Prince Philip the Fair. To spur an invasion, Pope Martin IV declared a crusade against Aragon, citing King Peter's excommunication and granting an indulgence to any man who died fighting against Peter. Both France and Aragon prepared for war.

Through the winter of 1283–1284, both sides continued their war preparations. Though he had been successful in Sicily, Peter of Aragon's war in the east had divided his kingdom's resources, and he faced an increasingly hostile political situation in Aragon; an coalition of Aragonese nobility disputed the King's authority over matters of state, and a populist uprising broke out against Peter's patrician supporters in Barcelona. After negotiations with a faction of nobles, Peter was forced to cede some of his rights as king and release noble prisoners in exchange for the manpower needed to defend Barcelona, his family's seat of power. Peter's diplomatic wrangling with the border counties between the Aragon and France met with mixed success; Roger-Bernard III of Foix, whom Peter had captured and released, joined the French and sent troops against Aragon, while Ermengol X of Urgell and Arnold Roger I of Pallars Sobirà joined Aragon against the French crusaders.

In late 1283, King James II of Majorca, Peter's younger brother, announced his intent to support the French crusade and recognized French suzerainty over Montpellier, while also giving the French army free passage through the Balearic Islands and Roussillon. James and Peter had a longstanding rivalry (Peter had opposed James' inheritance of Majorca after the death of their father), with both brothers desiring each-others kingdoms. While Majorcan support for France eased the French invasion of Aragon, James' actions inadvertently upset Philip's ambitions; the French king had hoped to annex Roussillon from Majorca, but now found himself awkwardly allied to James and therefore politically unable to seize the territory. Regardless of the Majorcan intervention, Philip resolved to move ahead with his invasion; on February 22, 1284, Philip's son Charles of Valois was crowned King of Aragon, a direct challenge to Peter.

=== French invasion ===
Advance of the French crusader army into Aragon

By 1285, Philip had amassed the fiscal and political means to launch his crusade, and deployed the French royal army to Toulouse and Navarra. In the summer of 1285, the French crusader army under Philip and Charles of Valois entered Roussillon. Contemporary chronicles listed a huge force of between 80,000 and 100,000 men, while more modern sources estimate the size of the army as being around 1,500 mounted cavalry and 6,500–8,000 infantry. Regardless of size, sources have described the army as one of the largest assembled by France in the 13th century, possibly the largest French expedition into Iberia since the time of Charlemagne. Though the French had James of Majorca's support, the local populace rose against them and did not allow a quick French passage. When the French army reached the city of Elne, the city refused to open its gates. Elne was valiantly defended by the so-called bâtard de Roussillon ("bastard of Roussillon"), the illegitimate son of Nuño Sánchez, late count of Roussillon. Eventually the city was overcome and brutally sacked, with the French then continuing their advance south. Local nobles conducted a scorched earth campaign against the French, prompting Philip to order his army to isolate any Aragonese garrison they encountered and continue south quickly, fearful of running out of supplies. Peter and the Aragonese army fell back from the frontier, not willing to risk attacking the larger French army - Peter was also awaiting the return of the men and ships he had fighting in Sicily.

Philip made slow but consistent progress southward, and by late June the French army had reached Girona, laying siege to the city in the heat of the Catalan summer. Philip's army needed constant resupply, forcing the French to move supplies through contested countryside to their rear or to ship supplies by sea to the town of Roses, 20 miles from Girona. The Aragonese probed the French lines around Girona, and tried to cut the road to Rosas, but failed; Peter was still unwilling to risk an open battle with the French. While the respective royal armies maneuvered on land, clusters of armed merchant ships and Catalan pirates preyed on French shipping, conducting a successful guerilla war at sea. Frustrated by small squadrons of Catalan galleys raiding their supply lines, the French prepared to blockade Barcelona.

In early September, the main Aragonese fleet under Roger of Lauria arrived from Sicily. On 3 September, his fleet attacked and decisively defeated a French fleet at the Battle of Les Formigues, giving Aragon control of the Catalan coast and cutting the French army's ability to resupply by sea. Lauria followed his victory with a raid on Roses, capturing many French ships in the harbor and seizing the main supply depot for the French royal army. Girona fell to the French on 7 September, but the victorious army was fast running out of supplies. The French held a ceremony to officially crown Charles of Valois 'King of Aragon' there, but without an actual crown, and the French army was by this time suffering from an outbreak of dysentery. By mid-September, Philip had decided to end the campaign and began to withdraw back towards the French border.

As the French army withdrew, it suffered badly from attrition and guerilla attacks, while Philip himself was afflicted with dysentery. The heir to the French throne, Prince Philip the Fair of Navarre, opened negotiations with Peter for free passage for the royal family through the Pyrenees, and Peter agreed, not wanting to risk a protracted war with France. The French army was not granted this stay and was attacked and routed at the Battle of the Col de Panissars. Philip himself succumbed to dysentery, dying at Perpignan in October. James of Majorca, unable to resist the Aragonese advance without French support, fled his lands and Mallorca was occupied by an Aragonese army late in the summer.

The French war against Aragon - already unpopular in France - collapsed with the defeat of Philip's invasion. With France's military strength sapped by the losses incurred during the crusade, the newly crowned Philip IV chose to not pursue further conflict with Aragon in Iberia.

== Leadership and diplomatic changes ==
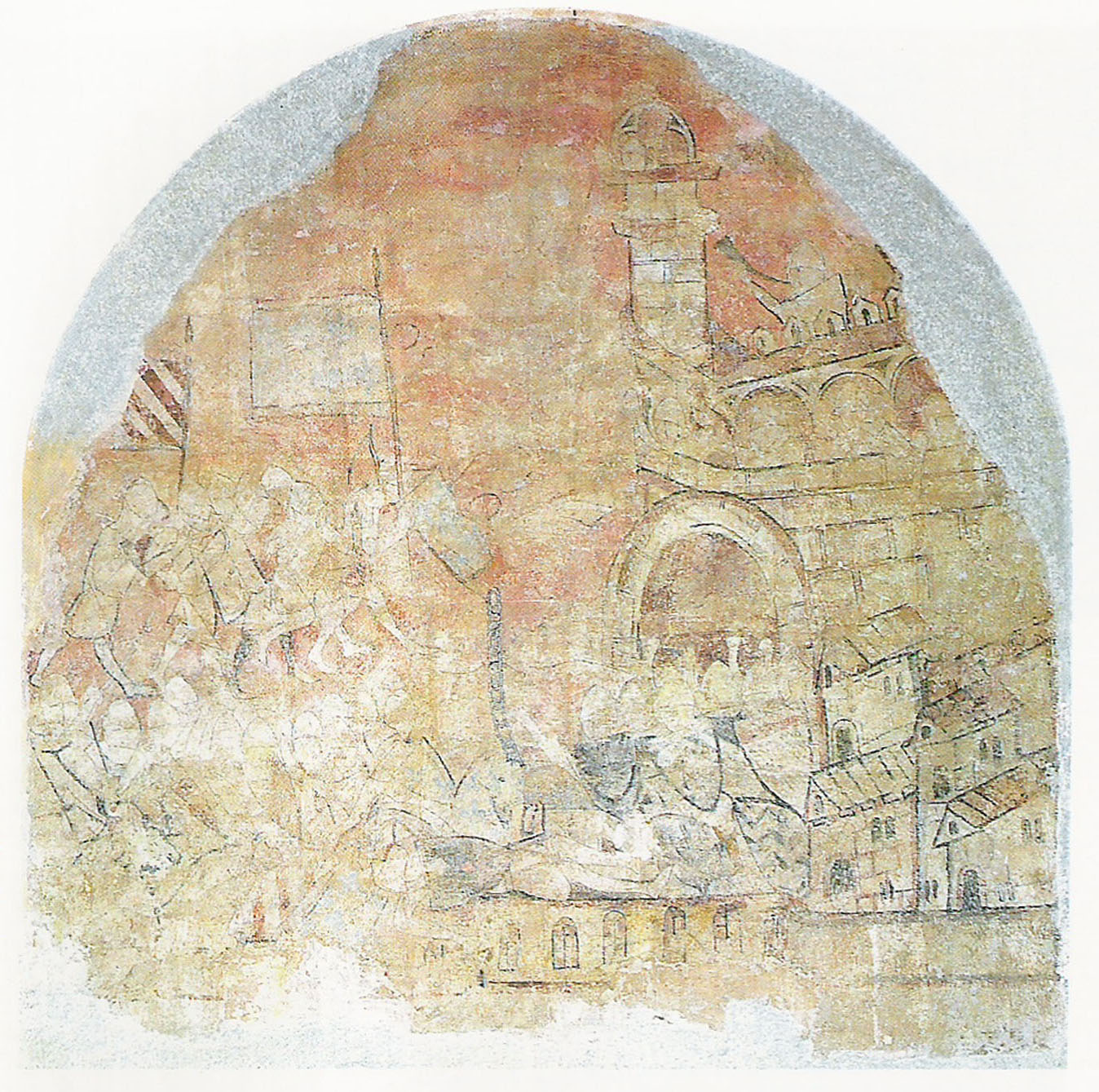
14th century fresco depicting the French siege of Girona in 1285

In Aragon, Peter unexpectedly died of a fever on 2 November 1285—thus, all three monarchs at the start of the conflict were dead by the end of 1285. Pope Martin IV was also dead, having been forced to flee Rome during a civil uprising, and then taken ill and died in March 1285. The new monarchs who had inherited the war had different priorities, but the end of the year marked a lull in the conflict. Prince Philip the Fair of Navarre, now Philip IV of France, did not support the war with Aragon, and was more interested in dealing with domestic issues. Prince Charles of Naples, heir to Charles of Anjou, was a prisoner of the Aragonese, with his government managed by the late Charles' councilors. The regent of Naples, Robert II of Artois, proved to be a capable administrator and used Aragon's war with France in Iberia as an opportunity to rebuild the Angevins' battered armies and fleets.

Peter of Aragon's kingdoms were split following his death, with the crown of Aragon passing to Alfonso III of Aragon and the crown of Sicily passing to James II of Sicily. The two monarchs hoped to consolidate the House of Barcelona's gains, and to annex their uncle James' lands in Mallorca. Alfonso was also engaged in a border war with Castile, threatening the western flank of a still-unstable Aragon.

=== Angevin re-armament and diplomatic efforts ===
With the collapse of the French crusade, intermittent warfare between the two sides continued, most notably in 1286 when Roger of Lauria raided Provence, and at the Battle of the Counts off the coast of Naples in June 1287, which saw Lauria destroy the remnants of the Angevin navy. The Aragonese–Sicilian fleet adopted a policy of trade warfare, attacking and seizing Angevin ships trying to circumvent Sicily. Ships of the Genoese (who were allied to the Angevins and French) were rarely attacked, as the Genoese and Catalan merchant communities were closely tied.

After the defeats of 1287, the Angevin kingdom—though still possessing a formidable army—began to seek a diplomatic accord with Aragon, while hoping to continue the war against Sicily. Fears of Castilian, Genoese, Venetian, or Holy Roman intervention also drove the peace process forward; a tentative agreement was reached in 1288, and Charles of Naples was ransomed from Aragonese captivity, but Pope Nicholas IV annulled the peace treaty and demanded Philip and the newly freed Charles invade Sicily.

In Naples, Charles II became distracted as his ally, the Kingdom of Hungary, devolved into a bitter civil war after the assassination of Ladislaus IV in 1290. Charles' wife, Mary of Hungary, was declared queen of Hungary by a faction of Hungarian nobles in 1291, and her husband supported her and their son's efforts to claim the Hungarian throne.

=== Rule of Alfonso III and the Union of Aragon ===
In Aragon, king Alfonso was beleaguered by internal troubles; the cost of the wars in Catalonia and Sicily weighed heavily on the Aragonese economy, the populace tired of war, and the Aragonese nobility demanded an end to foreign wars being waged by the Crown without their consent. The late king Peter's concessions to the nobility in 1283 gradually evolved into the Union of Aragon, a political entity of nobles that proclaimed itself as the legal guardian of Aragonese law. The Union pressured Alfonso to devolve powers to them, and used military force against the king to enforce its demands in 1287.

While the situation in Aragon grew more unstable, the war continued. There were fears that the newly-empowered Aragonese nobility would demand that Alfonso seize control of Navarre, still ruled by Philip, and thus war with France would break out again. Sicily remained the key point of contention between the French/Papal parties and the House of Barcelona, but neither side was willing to abandon their claim. A change came in 1290, when Philip bribed one of Charles of Anjou's heirs to give up his claim on Sicily, thereby freeing France of its obligation to invade. Charles of Valois, whom the papacy had granted the throne of Aragon, was also pressured to give up his claim in return for papal promises to grant him lands in Sicily and perhaps a throne in the future; he would continue to seek a crown as a semi-independent prince. In 1291, seeking to further cool tensions, Alfonso and Pope Nicholas signed the Treaty of Tarascon, in which Alfonso tentatively agreed to not hold Sicily against papal wishes and to remove some Aragonese troops from the island. King James of Sicily was not a signatory but supported resolving the conflict. However, Alfonso died less than a month after signing the treaty, rendering it void.

Alfonso's death passed the crown of Aragon to James, who now ruled both Aragon and Sicily. James spent much of 1291 consolidating his rule over Aragon, while also sending the Aragonese fleet back to Sicily. Renewed fighting between the Angevins and Aragonese broke out in Calabria; the Angevins recaptured the city of Crotone, while the Aragonese raided the Calabrian coastline.

=== A new Aragonese policy ===
In July 1292, Roger of Lauria led the Aragonese-Sicilian fleet in a major naval expedition to Greece, often called "Romania" in contemporary sources. Seeking to replenish the Aragonese treasury and undermine Angevin support for the war, Lauria's fleet raided towns, harried shipping, and captured hostages; Angevin targets were given precedence, but Lauria also attacked any targets of opportunity, including Byzantine, Venetian, and Genoese settlements. The fleet first struck Cephalonia and the Ionian islands, then plundered Corfu, the Cyclades islands, before moving east to attack the port town of Candia on Crete. Moving north into the Aegean, Lauria's force mounted a large raid on the Genoese-held island of Chios, plundering a fortune in Mastic gum, before turning south to attack the Angevin-ruled Principality of Achaea. The fleet returned to Sicily in late summer, stopping to raid Corfu a second time and possibly making an aborted attack on Brindisi, before docking in Messina on 21 September 1292. The campaign resulted in an influx of funds to the Aragonese-Sicily government, and more than covered the operating cost of the fleet for a year. Aragonese sources reported that Lauria lost one ship and 58 men in the course of the expedition. In addition to funding Aragon's war, the raid showed the decline of Angevin power in Greece—towns, cities, and merchants whom had submitted to the rule of Charles of Anjou during the Angevin expansion into Greece two decades before, now found themselves vulnerable under the rule of Charles II, whose kingly prestige suffered a serious blow.

While his fleets raided abroad, James worked to cement his new rule in Aragon. Though he had been king of Sicily first, James was more interested in preserving the authority of the monarchy in Aragon and combating rebellious Union of Aragon. Keen to stabilize his kingdom, James made diplomatic signals that he was willing to give up Sicily in exchange for a lasting peace with the French-papal alliance and compensation. However, the powerful Catalan merchant class, which had secured large trade concessions in Sicily, demanded the Aragon maintain some control over the island. In addition, some Aragonese noble families had acquired fiefs in Sicily, and so were remiss to give up the island to the Angevins. Complicating matters further, the Sicilians themselves, led by Queen Constance and the Sicilian parliament, were adamant that Sicily would not bow to papal or Angevin rule. With these issues still unresolved, James returned to Aragon to secure a peace with Castile, ordering an end to offensive action against the Angevins in early 1293. James met with Charles II of Naples in November 1293, with James agreeing to renounce his claim to the Sicilian throne in exchange for compensation and the expectation that his excommunication would be rendered void. However, no official peace treaty could be signed without papal approval, and no pope was in power at the time due to electoral disputes in Rome.

== Aragon changes sides, Sicilian resistance ==
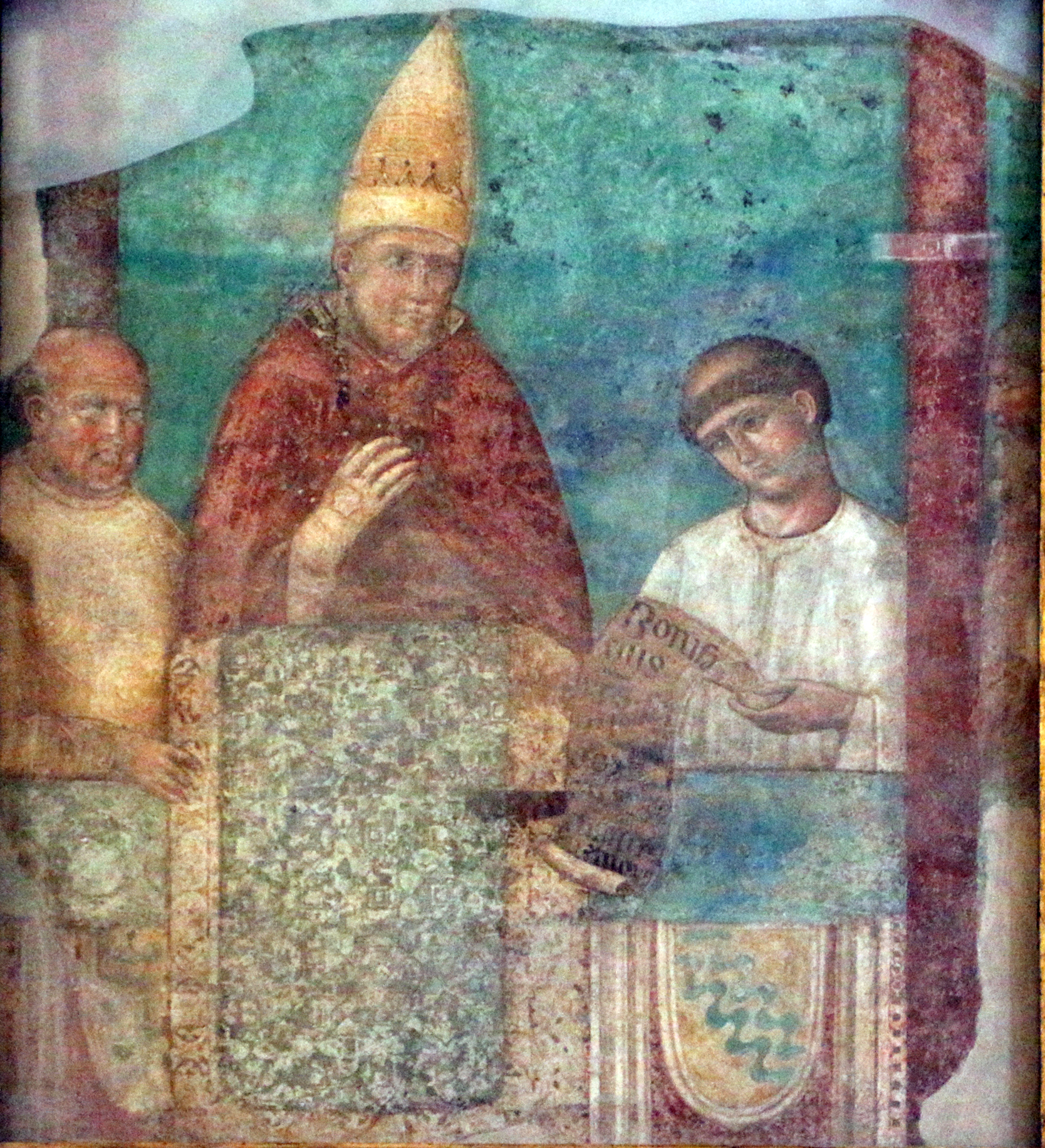
Pope Boniface VIII, elected in 1295, was heavily involved in ending fighting between Aragon and Angevin Naples. His diplomatic efforts were focused on enforcing the temporal power of the church and with securing the papal right to hold Sicily as a vassal state.

=== Election of Boniface VIII and Papal overtures to Aragon ===
The 1295 election of Pope Boniface VIII opened a path to peace, as Boniface was keen to resolve the Sicilian issue. Eager to strengthen the temporal and political power of the church, Boniface was adamant that Sicily be returned to Angevin rule and that Sicily once more become a vassal state to the Holy See, the pre-war political privilege the papacy held over Sicily.

To accomplish this Boniface made diplomatic overtures to the Aragonese leadership, hoping to win their support for an Angevin restoration in Sicily and to divide them from their Sicilian allies. The elderly John of Procida, infante Frederick of Barcelona (younger brother of James of Aragon and viceroy of Sicily), and Roger of Lauria met with Boniface in Velletri, where the pope offered them terms for an Aragonese withdraw from Sicily. In addition to offering a draft of a peace treaty, Boniface offered the Aragonese leaders personal concessions; to Roger of Lauria, the pope offered to grant a papal fiefdom over the island of Djerba, while to Frederick he offered a marriage to Catherine de Courtenay, who nominally controlled territories in the Greek islands and had a claim to the throne of the Latin Empire. According to some sources, the pope also offered Frederick an army and a papal sanction to invade the Byzantine Empire in exchange for the Aragonese prince's abandonment of Sicily.

After negotiations resumed, James agreed to the 1295 Treaty of Anagni, by which he forfeited the crown of Sicily to the papacy and agreed to marry a member of Charles II's family, Blanche of Anjou, thus securing peace between Aragon, the Angevin kingdom, and the papacy. Aragon also took on Majorca as a vassal, ending its military occupation but gaining effective control of the Kingdom of Majorca. Aragon also received substantial monetary compensation (12,000 livre tournois), Charles of Valois was forced to give up his claim to the throne of Aragon, and the order of excommunication was lifted from James. Boniface took the treaty to mean the end of the Sicilian rebellion and re-affirmed Charles II's right to rule Sicily, who began to plan a new invasion of the island to reinstate Angevin rule.

=== Crowning of Frederick III ===
Despite the changing diplomatic situation, the Sicilians objected to any return of Angevin rule over Sicily and so considered the treaty to be invalid. Led by Queen Constance of Sicily and the Sicilian parliament, the island prepared to continue the war. Pope Boniface's offer of a lucrative marriage partner for Frederick fell through, and soon after the Aragonese prince re-affirmed his desire to rule Sicily. In late 1295, Frederick announced that Aragon had abandoned the island and in December he was declared "Lord of the Island", pending a plebiscite to install him as king. After a gathering of its delegates in Palermo, in March 1296 the Sicilian parliament crowned Frederick as Frederick III, King of Sicily. Frederick, although still a prince of Aragon, resolved to defend the island.

With Frederick's ascension as king, relations between Aragon and Sicily turned from ally to potential belligerent. Aragon was pressured by treaty to assist Angevin Naples and the papacy in reconquering Sicily, but James did not invade immediately, instead recalling all Aragonese and Catalans from the island. The rift between allies split the loyalties of many nobles; years of war and trade relations had resulted in many wealthy nobles and merchants, notably admiral Roger of Lauria, possessing lands in both Aragon and Sicily. Aragonese and Sicilian crews often served on the same warships, and many Aragonese soldiers were garrisoned in Sicily. When James recalled his fellow Catalans from Sicily, thousands chose to stay loyal to Sicily and Frederick.

As the year 1296 progressed, James became distracted in Iberia as Castile devolved into civil war, and so Frederick and his newly-independent Sicilian forces went on the offensive in Calabria, harassing Angevin forces. Pope Boniface demanded that James support the Angevin's war against Sicily, but James was in no rush to do so; instead, he attempted to schedule a series of peace summits with Frederick in an attempt to convince his brother to peacefully give up the island kingdom. Frederick rebuffed his brother's overtures, instead consulting with the Sicilian parliament on what the island kingdom's course of action would be. As it became increasingly apparent that Aragon, Angevin Naples, and the papacy would only accept the submission of Sicily, Frederick and the Sicilians furthered their military preparations to maintain Sicilian independence.

== Aragonese–Angevin−Papal alliance against Sicily ==
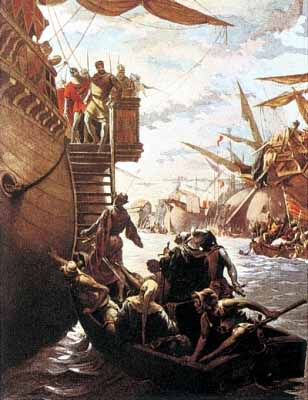
Aragonese–Sicilian admiral Roger of Lauria's capture of Prince Charles of Naples at the Battle of the Gulf of Naples in 1284. Originally a staunch enemy of Angevin Naples, Lauria would from 1297 to 1302 lead a combined Aragonese–Angevin fleet against Sicily alongside Charles' son, Robert of Naples.

In the summer of 1296 Frederick continued his offensive against Angevin forces in Calabria, capturing Catanzaro and Squillace, while Crotone rose up against the Angevin garrison and submitted to the Sicilians. However, disputes between Frederick and Roger of Lauria began to show during the campaign as the two disagreed on Sicilian strategy. In October a small Sicilian squadron intercepted and routed an Angevin fleet trying to raid Ischia, enraging Charles II and causing him and Boniface to redouble their efforts to have James and Aragon re-enter the war on their side. After a final peace overture to his brother failed in February 1297, in March James travelled to Rome to confer with Boniface. In Rome, James negotiated a new treaty in which he agreed to make war on his brother and Sicily in exchange for further compensation, namely money and papal sanction to annex Sardinia and Corsica. Roger of Lauria, now out of favor with Frederick, left Sicily to attend the wedding of Yolande of Aragon to Robert of Naples, a political marriage designed to bind Aragon to Angevin Naples. Using the wedding festivities as political cover, Roger subsequently re-entered James' service and the king named him 'High Admiral for Life' of the Aragonese fleet.

With their new alliances secured, Aragon and Angevin Naples prepared to go on the offensive against Sicily in 1297. With Aragon requiring time to re-deploy its navy from Iberia, Angevin Naples struck first, seeking to drive Frederick from Calabria. Led by Angevin general Pietro Ruffo and Roger of Lauria, the Angevin army marched on and besieged Cantanzaro, which the Sicilians had taken the previous year. Frederick dispatched a Sicilian army to break the siege, and in the ensuing battle the Angevin army was defeated and forced to retreat. Having secured his gains in Calabria, Frederick encouraged revolt in Naples, negotiated with the anti-papist Ghibellines of Tuscany, Lombardy, and Genoa, while assisting the House of Colonna against the pope. He also wrote poems in support of the Union of Aragon nobility in an attempt to provoke resistance to his brother James in Aragon. Sicilian defenses were hardened; The Sicilian army had years of experience, and so was still a capable fighting force without Aragonese assistance. Frederick also worked to build up the Sicilian navy, while in Naples the Angevins did the same.

=== 1298–1301 invasion of Sicily ===
By 1298, James had re-organized the Aragonese navy and was prepared to have Aragon re-join the war in force. A combined allied fleet of 50 Aragonese and 30 Angevin galleys was assembled in Naples, while the Sicilians were able to raise 64 galleys led by former Genoese admiral Corrado Doria. To secure a beachhead on Sicily, James (who commanded the Aragonese-Angevin army) needed a secure port for the allied fleet to use during the winter months. In the summer of 1298 the allied fleet sailed to and captured Patti in northern Sicily, but an attempt to push inland was abandoned in the face of local resistance. Later in the summer, the allied force embarked on a major campaign to capture Syracuse, succeeding in capturing several nearby towns and laying siege to the city. However, Frederick and his commanders kept up a successful campaign of guerilla warfare, using cavalry raids to strike isolated allied garrisons and supply lines. Winter set in and battered both sides, draining valuable manpower, while Patti rose in revolt and expelled the allied garrison. Roger of Lauria led a ground force to retake Patti, but a small fleet sent to help relive the fortress was surprised and defeated by a Sicilian squadron, costing the allied fleet 16 ships and granting the Sicilians near-parity with the Aragonese-Angevin fleet.

In March 1299, James was forced to lift his siege of Syracuse. Though the allies retained control over several coastal towns, the siege had sapped Aragonese–Angevin manpower and supplies. James sent out peace feelers to Frederick, but was rebuffed by his brother, who also had a relative of Roger of Lauria's executed. James sailed for Naples and then Barcelona, returning to the theatre in May with a fresh army. By July a second allied invasion fleet was ready to depart Naples. Sailing to northern Sicily, the fleet rounded the Cape of Orlando and landed at the town of San Marco d'Alunzio. The allied fleet, again headed by Roger of Lauria, took up defensive positions on the beach. Frederick and the Sicilian fleet arrived soon after to disrupt the invasion, and despite being outnumbered, attacked the allied position. In the ensuing Battle of Cape Orlando on 4 July, the Sicilian fleet suffered a major defeat, granting the allies command of the sea. James - having been informed of growing unrest in Catalonia - returned to Aragon soon after the victory, leaving Lauria and the Angevins to continue the war in Sicily. Some sources have alleged that James, tired of expending Aragonese resources fighting a fellow member of the House of Barcelona and his former subjects, intentionally shifted his attention back to Iberia and away from Sicily, and James would never return to the theatre.

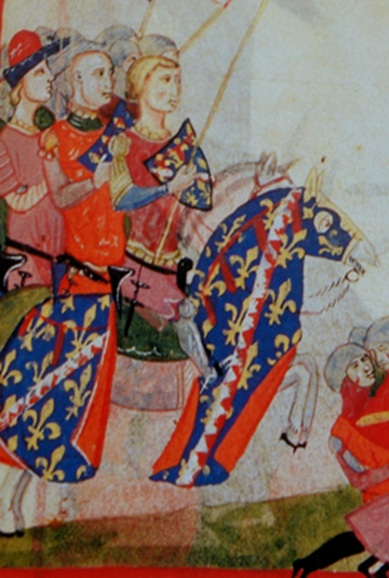
Prince Philip of Taranto, Charles II of Naples' second son, led the western Angevin army until being captured at the pivotal Battle of Falconaria in 1299.

Having secured a beachhead on Sicily, the Angevins began landing troops on the island. Led by Charles' son Robert and Roger of Lauria, the Angevins spread out to seize control of towns and fortresses. The Angevin army moved to besiege Randazzo, but faced stiff resistance and so proceeded south along the western edge of Mount Etna, marching south towards the key port city of Catania. As they advanced across the countryside, the Angevins captured several towns while also decimating the fiefs of those nobles known to support Frederick. Catania was soon besieged, and after several weeks an internal coup resulted in the city being occupied by the Angevin army. A major victory for the allies, the fall of Catania resulted in several nearby towns also surrendering to Robert and Roger of Lauria. The loss of the city also forced Frederick to relocate his court, as the Angevin position in Catania threatened Syracuse and Messina. Retreating to the central highlands of Sicily, Frederick chose the city of Castrogiovanni as his base of operations. Frederick's new position in the central Sicilian highlands moved him away from the larger costal cities, but also strengthened his internal lines of communication, as from Castrogiovanni's commanding plateau he was able to send out forces to counter the Angevins wherever they chose to attack.

Having captured Catania and isolated Messina and Syracuse in the east, the Angevins now prepared an invasion of western Sicily, hoping to catch Frederick's remaining forces in a pincer. In November 1299 a second Angevin army led by Charles' second son, Philip of Taranto, landed in western Sicily and besieged Trapani. Faced with a choice of waiting in heavily fortified Castrogiovanni to be trapped between the eastern and western Angevin armies or going on the offensive, Frederick consolidated his forces and marched to attack Philip in the west. Philip, unable to capture Trapani, marched to besiege Marsala; the two armies encountered each other near the city, and in the ensuing Battle of Falconaria the Angevin army was routed and Philip captured. The battle was a major victory for Frederick and boosted the morale of the Sicilians. With the western Angevin army destroyed, Roger of Lauria and Robert in the east were forced to stop their advance until spring, with Roger sailing to Naples to collect reinforcements.

In February 1300, an advance force of 300 Angevin knights, lured by the promise of a weak fortress at Gagliano, were destroyed in a Sicilian ambush at the Battle of Gagliano, further blunting Robert's ability to advance in Sicily. While the ground campaign stalled, on 14 June 1300 Roger of Lauria and the allied fleet defeated the Sicilians at the Battle of Ponza, crippling the Sicilian navy and relegating it to small-scale attacks. The allied fleet sailed to the south coast of Sicily, raiding towns and castles but failing to land additional allied troops.

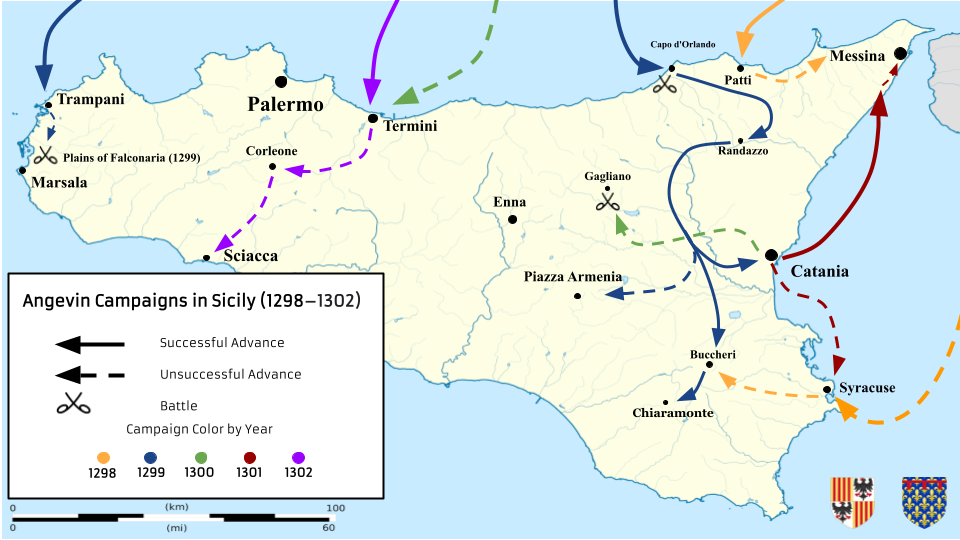
Map detailing the Angevin campaign (1298–1302) to invade Sicily.

In early 1301 Robert, frustrated by the stalemate on land, took command of half of the allied fleet while Roger maintained the other half. In July a deadly storm struck both fleets, resulting in the loss of nearly 30 galleys. The loss of ships and skilled crews to weather and disease sapped allied naval power, and an abortive attempt to besiege Syracuse also resulted in the loss of several ships.

With any westward movement blocked by Frederick's armies, the Angevins chose instead to strike north towards Messina, laying siege to the strategically important city in August. The allied fleet blockaded the city, while Angevin soldiers burned the countryside that fed the populace. Realizing the need to relieve Messina, the Sicilians conducted two overland campaigns to open a supply line to the city, the second commanded by Frederick himself, while a small flotilla under the command of mercenary captain Roger de Flor harassed Roger of Lauria's blockading fleet. The Sicilian resupply missions kept up morale in the city, and while famine devastated the population and Sicilian garrison, Messina refused to surrender. Seeing that Messina could not be starved into submission and facing a blistering series of small Sicilian attacks, Roger and Robert agreed to withdraw all Angevin soldiers on the island to Catania. A peace compact was brokered between Frederick and his sister Yolanda, which the Angevins agreed to abide by.

=== Invasion of Charles of Valois ===
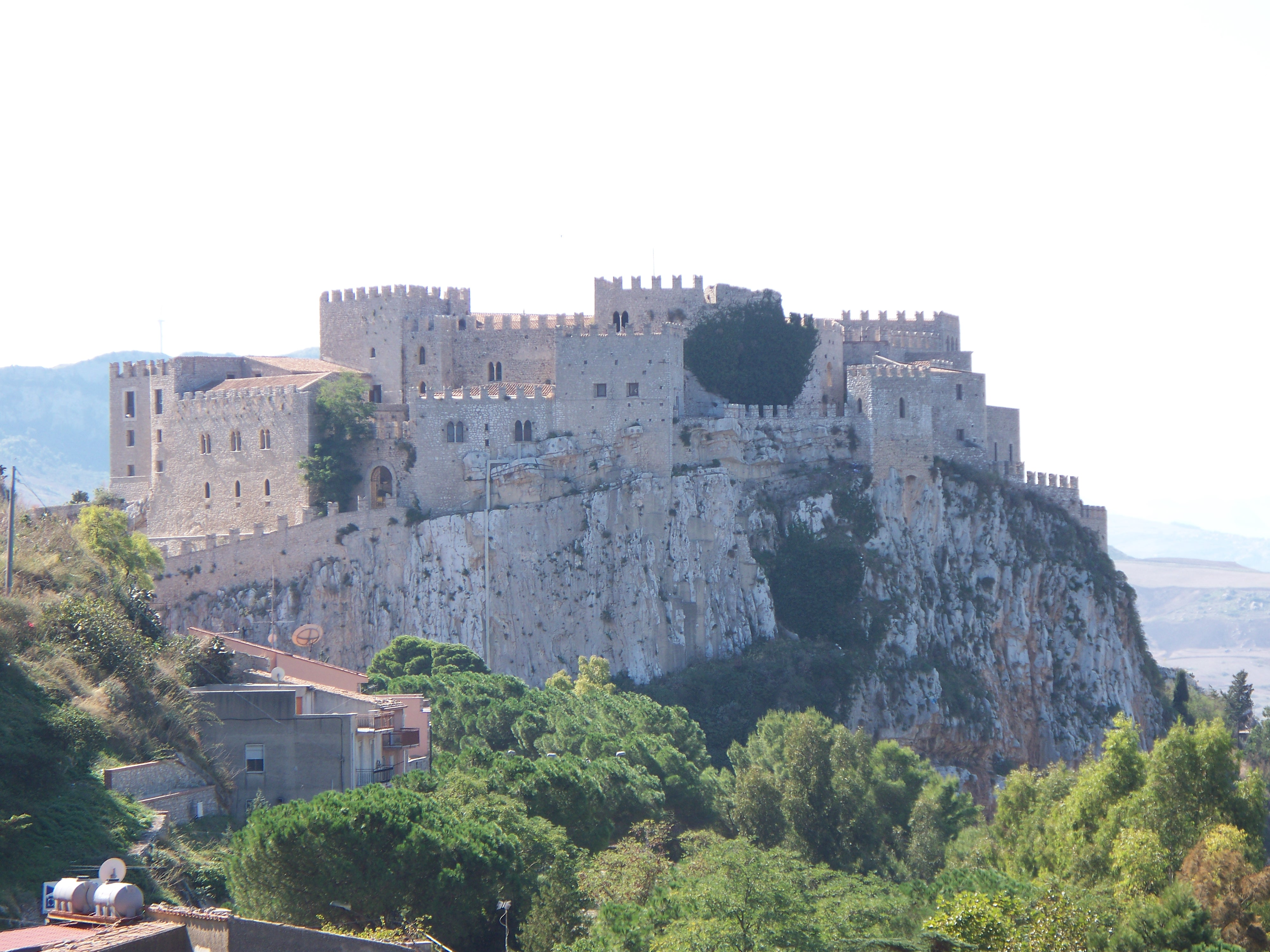
The Castello di Caccamo in Caccamo, western Sicily. Rugged terrain and fortified towns posed a major challenge to invading armies during the War of the Sicilian Vespers.

By 1302, Angevin resolve to continue the war was flagging, and pope Boniface feared that all sides would soon make peace with the Sicilians. As such, he contacted Prince Charles of Valois to convince him to march an army into Italy. Acting independently as a French prince, Valois received significant financial backing from the papacy and the French court. As he moved south through Italy, Valois used his army to crush supporters of the anti-papal Ghibellines in Tuscany and Florence. Once in Naples, Valois signed an accord with the pope and Angevins offering him support for a future venture to restore the Latin Empire if he were to successfully conquer Sicily. In the summer of 1302, the peace compact between Sicily and Angevin Naples expired, allowing the Angevins to begin providing men and ships to Valois' invasion force. Faced with Charles of Valois' large and professional French army, Frederick chose to fortify coastal towns and scour the countryside of food, planning to wear down the invaders in a war of attrition.

The allied fleet, now laden with Valois' army, landed at Termini on the northern coast, encountering no resistance. While Roger of Lauria raided the coastline near Palermo, the Valois army marched inland in an attempt to seize the Sicilian heartland. The army besieged Caccamo, but found it too well defended, and so moved on to Corleone, which also resisted Valois. Seeking to resupply his army by sea, Valois then marched to Sciacca on the southwest coast of Sicily, arriving in July. As the allied army moved, Frederick and the Sicilians shadowed them through the countryside, choosing not to engage them directly. Disease, starvation, and the hot Sicilian summer devastated Valois' army, which was unable to break through the defenses at Sciacca; by August 1302, Valois chose to send envoys to Frederick to discuss peace. In mid-August, Valois agreed to leave the island, and the Angevins agreed to evacuate their remaining garrisons in eastern Sicily in return for Frederick withdrawing his forces from the Italian mainland. With Charles of Valois defeated, Charles II unable to mount a successful invasion, and James of Aragon being unmotivated to continue the war, all sides began to seek peace.

== Conclusion and Peace ==
=== Peace of Caltabellotta ===
On 19 August, the Peace of Caltabellotta was signed. The treaty confirmed Frederick as King of Sicily and Charles as King of the Mezzogiorno, known thereafter as the Kingdom of Naples. Pope Boniface initially refused to sign the treaty, but the papal coalition against Sicily was near collapse. With his options limited, in 1303 the pope ratified the treaty and Frederick paid him tribute to smooth the peace process. Marriage was arranged between Frederick and Charles' daughter Eleanor to tie the Sicilian House of Barcelona to Angevin Naples, and the papacy agreed to cede its claim to hold Sicily as a vassal kingdom. A clause in the treaty mandated that Frederick's throne would pass to the House of Anjou upon his death, and Frederick agreed to provide military assistance to Charles of Valois if he moved to invade Byzantium.

Now recognized as king over Sicily, Frederick adopted the title of King of Trinacria, but to keep the Ghibelline legacy of the Staufer alive he subsequently preferred to call himself "King" without any territorial reference in his chancellery acts from 1304 to 1311, then used "King of Sicily" from 1315 to 1318, and struck coins throughout his reign as rex Sicilie.

== Aftermath ==
The War of the Sicilian Vespers, and the several treaties drawn up to end it, would continue to effect regional politics for decades. Aragon had gained and then given up the crown of Sicily, but its gaining of mercantile interests in Sicily and control over Mallorca and Sardinia (annexed by Aragon in 1323) made it a major power in the Mediterranean. The crownlands of Sicily itself had been split between Sicily and Naples, with different dynasties ruling each half. Frederick III's crown was not restored to the House of Anjou on his death, and so the House of Barcelona maintained rule of the island until the 15th century. The kingdoms of Sicily and Naples would remain separate until 1734, when the crowns of both kingdoms were held by Charles III of Spain, and would remain politically separate until the formation of the Kingdom of the Two Sicilies in 1815.

The conflict disrupted the military scene of Europe. Using the chaos of the war as cover, the Republic of Genoa declared war on its rival Pisa, crushing the Pisan fleet at the Battle of Meloria in 1284, sending Pisa into decline and temporarily establishing Genoa as the pre-eminent naval power in the Western Mediterranean. The war contributed to the decisive defeat of the Crusader States at the Siege of Acre, as the Vesperan conflict left the major Christian powers of Europe unwilling to commit troops to the Holy Land.

A mercenary company formed by veterans of the war, the Catalan Company, would play a major role in the history of the Eastern Mediterranean.

== Legacy ==
The war, fought between Christian powers over claims to European thrones, is seen by some sources as a sign of the end of the Crusading era, and an indicative sign of the degradation of papal powers over excommunication and indulgence.

In the 19th century, the Sicilian Vespers and subsequent war became a symbol of Sicilian independence and tenacity. The legacy of the revolt carried a poignant political message for some Sicilians, as the Kingdom of the Two Sicilies was ruled by the culturally French House of Bourbon-Two Sicilies. The rule over Sicily by a French royal family based in Naples invited obvious comparisons with the Angevin kingdom of the 13th century. Italian historian and political activist Michele Amari wrote a popular history of the conflict (La guerra del vespro siciliano, published 1842), which became widely circulated among independence agitators on the island.

== Contemporary chronicles ==
- Lu rebellamentu di Sichilia
- Leggenda di Messer Gianni di Procida
- Liber Jani de Procida et Palialoco

== Popular culture ==
- Dante Alighieri's Divine Comedy references several historical figures from the war, negatively portraying what Dante saw as the avarice of the involved monarchs.
- During the later 15th Century, the Catalan work Tirant lo Blanch, written by Joanot Martorell and Martí Joan de Galba, made allusions to the Vesperan war, celebrating the military successes of Aragon and admiral Roger of Lauria.
- A French play about the event, Les vêpres siciliennes, was written in 1838 by Eugène Scribe and Charles Duveyrier. In 1855 Giuseppe Verdi set it to music as the opera I vespri siciliani. An Italian film directed by Giorgio Pastina based on Verdi's rendition, Sicilian Uprising, was released in 1949.
- A popular theory holds that the Mafia began with the Sicilian Vespers and is an abbreviation for "Morte ai Francesi, Italia Anela!" ("Italy desires the death of the French"). However, this is highly unlikely since the first reference to the term Mafia dates from 1862.

== Sources ==
=== Primary ===
The Rebellamentu di Sichilia, a Sicilian tract of 1290, is available online in three editions:

- Lu rebellamentu di Sichilia. Codice della Biblioteca regionale di Palermo. Edited by Filippo Evola (1882).
- Le vespro siciliano. Cronaca siciliana anonima intitolata Lu rebellamentu di Sichilia, codice esistente nell' Archivio municipale di Catania. Edited by Pasquale Castorina (1882).
- Sicily's Rebellion against King Charles. Translation of the text of the "Rebellamentu" by Louis Mendola (New York 2015) ISBN 978-1943639038.

The Vinuta di lu re Iapicu in Catania, another Sicilian history, by Atanasiu di Iaci, is available online:

- Romanzo siculo del 1287. Edited by Bernardino Biondelli (1856).

The contemporary Catalan chroniclers:

- Bernat Desclot, Crònica, ed. Ferran Soldevila, Jordi Bruguera and Maria Teresa Ferrer i Mallol, Barcelona 2008
- Ramon Muntaner, Crònica, ed. Ferran Soldevila, Jordi Bruguera and Maria Teresa Ferrer i Mallol, Barcelona 2011 (English tr. Anna Kinsky Goodenough, Chronicle of Muntaner, London 1920)

Note also:

- Bruni, Leonardo. History of the Florentine People. 1416. ISBN 0-674-00506-6 (Harvard, 2001)

=== Secondary ===
- Abulafia, David (1997), The Western Mediterranean Kingdoms, 1200–1500: The Struggle for Dominion, London: Longman, ISBN 0-582-07820-2
- Abulafia, David (2000). "Charles of Anjou reassessed". Journal of Medieval History. 26 (1). doi:10.1016/s0304-4181(99)00012-3. ISSN 0304-4181. S2CID 159990935.
- Amari, Michele (1886), La guerra del Vespro siciliano, vol. 1–3 (9 ed.), Milan: Hoepli (vol. 1, vol. 2, vol. 3) (English tr. of 2nd (?) edn. Francis Egerton, History of the War of Sicilian Vespers, 3 vols., London 1850: vol. 1, vol. 2, vol. 3)
- Backman, Clifford R. (1995), The Decline and Fall of Medieval Sicily: Politics, Religion, and Economy in the Reign of Frederick III, 1296–1337, Cambridge: Cambridge University Press, ISBN 0521496640
- Bresc, Henri (1986), Un monde méditerranéen. Économie et société en Sicile, 1300–1450, Bibliothèque des écoles françaises d'Athènes et de Rome, vol. 262, Rome: École française de Rome, doi:10.3406/befar.1986.1245, ISBN 2728301034
- Caro, Georg (1895–1899), Genua und die Mächte am Mittelmeer 1257–1311. Ein Beitrag zur Geschichte des XIII. Jahrhunderts, vol. 1–2, Halle(vol. 1, vol. 2)
- Carr, Mike; Chrissis, Nikolaos G.; Raccagni, Gianluca (28 March 2024). Crusading Against Christians in the Middle Ages (1 ed.). Palgrave Macmillan Cham. doi:10.1007/978-3-031-47339-5. ISBN 978-3-031-47338-8.
- Chaytor, Henry J. (1933), A History of Aragon and Catalonia, London: Methuen
- Dunbabin, Jean (1998). Charles I of Anjou. Power, Kingship and State-Making in Thirteenth-Century Europe (1st ed.). Bloomsbury. ISBN 978-0582253704.
- Colomer Pérez, Guifré (2022), Memòries de la guerra de les Vespres (1282–1285). Controvèrsies ideològiques i conflictes polítics a la Mediterrània occidental (PDF), PhD thesis: Universitat Rovira i Virgili
- Davis-Secord, Sarah (2017). Where Three Worlds Met: Sicily in the Early Medieval Mediterranean (1st ed.). Cornell University Press. ISBN 978-1-5017-1259-3.
- Hillgarth, Jocelyn N. (1976), The Spanish Kingdoms, 1250–1516, vol. 1, Oxford: Clarendon Press, ISBN 019822530X
- Housley, Norman (1982), The Italian Crusades: The Papal-Angevin Alliance and the Crusades against Christian Lay Powers, 1254–1343, Oxford
- Lendering, Jona (2016). Pope against king: Causes for the War of the Sicilian Vespers (Medieval Warfare' 6, no. 2 ed.). Karwansaray BV.
- Migliazzo, Francesco (2023). City-Republics of Northern Italy and the Sicilian Vespers: The Perception of the Revolt in the Urban Chronicles (II ed.). Al-Masāq. doi:10.1080/09503110.2022.2135849.
- Mott, Lawrence V. (2003), Sea Power in the Medieval Mediterranean: The Catalan-Aragonese Fleet in the War of Sicilian Vespers, Gainesville, FL: University of Florida Press
- Novacco, Domenico (31 March 1959). "CONSIDERAZIONI SULLA FORTUNA DEL TERMINE « MAFIA »". Belfagor. 14 (2). JSTOR 26106878.
- Peri, Illuminato (1982), La Sicilia dopo il Vespro. Uomini, città e campagne, 1282–1376, Rome: Laterza
- Pryor, John H. (1983), "The Naval Battles of Roger de Lauria", Journal of Medieval History, 9 (3), doi:10.1016/0304-4181(83)90031-3
- Rohde, Hans Eduard (1913), Der Kampf um Sizilien in den Jahren 1291–1302, Berlin: Walther Rothschild
- Runciman, Steven (1958), The Sicilian Vespers: A History of the Mediterranean World in the Later Thirteenth Century, Cambridge, ISBN 0-521-43774-1
- Riley-Smith, Jonathan (2005). The Crusades: A History (II ed.). New Haven: Connecticut: Yale University Press. ISBN 0-8264-7270-2.
- Salavert y Roca, Vicente (1956), Cerdeña y la expansión mediterránea de la Corona de Aragón (1297–1314), Madrid: CSIC
- Schneidman, J.Lee (December 1969). "Ending the War of the Sicilian Vespers". Journal of Peace Research. 6 (4). doi:10.1177/002234336900600404. ISSN 0022-3433. S2CID 110273792.
- Shneidman, J. Lee (1960). Aragon and the War of the Sicilian Vespers (Vol. 22, No. 3 ed.). Taylor & Francis.
- Stanton, Charles D. (2019), Roger of Lauria (c. 1250–1305): 'Admiral of Admirals', Woodbridge: Boydell & Brewer, ISBN 978-1-78327-453-6
- Strayer, J. R. (January 1953). "The Crusade against Aragon". Speculum. 28 (1). doi:10.2307/2847183. ISSN 0038-7134. JSTOR 2847183. S2CID 162708245.
- Tyerman, Christopher (2019), The World of the Crusades: An Illustrated History, New Haven, CT: Yale University Press, ISBN 978-0-300-21739-1
- Welsh, William E. (2016). "Papal strongman: Charles of Anjou". Medieval Warfare. 6 (2). ISSN 2211-5129. JSTOR 48578551.
