= Battle of Falconaria =

Battle in the War of the Sicilian Vespers 1299

Coordinates: 37°56′14″N 12°31′56″E

- Part of War of the Sicilian Vespers
Date	1 December 1299
Location	La Falconara, between Marsala and Trapani
Result	Sicilian victory

Belligerents
Kingdom of Sicily	Kingdom of Naples

Commanders and leaders
Frederick II of Sicily	Philip I of Taranto (POW)

The Battle of Falconaria (also La Falconara or Falconeria) was fought in the latter days of the War of the Sicilian Vespers. Fought on 1 December 1299 between the forces of Frederick II of Sicily and Philip I of Taranto of the Kingdom of Naples, it was a momentous victory for Frederick and a disaster for Philip, who was captured.

== Prelude ==
Philip had been named, on 12 July 1294, as vicar-general of the Kingdom of Sicily by his father, Charles II of Naples. As such, he took over preparations for a general invasion of the island, which invasion was realised in November 1299. He landed with about fifty galleys and numerous militia and noblemen and besieged Trapani. Frederick lost no time in assembling the able-bodied citizenry and his own troops at Castrogiovanni and marching to relieve Trapani. On the plain of Falconaria, between Marsala and Trapani, the two armies met.

Philip assembled his army in traditional feudal fashion: three battles abreast. He himself commanded the right, while the centre was under the command of the marshal, Broglio dei Bonsi, and the left Thomas II Sanseverino, count of Marsico. Frederick too followed typical medieval tactics and aligned his forces in three columns side-by-side. Frederick commanded his own centre, composed entirely of infantry. The left he put under command of Blasco I of Alagona, with a little cavalry and some Almogàvers. The right was composed mainly of cavalry under the direction of Frederick's premier vassals, the victors of Montaperti.

== Battle ==
The battle started when the Sicilian left marched against Sanseverino. In response, Philip ordered his crossbowmen to bombard the Almogàvers. Philip himself then led his men against Blasco and the Sicilian left, but meeting strong resistance, he moved against the weak Sicilian centre under Frederick himself. This move was fatal. Broglio was impeded from entering at that moment and this gave the opportunity to Blasco to turn his Almogàver mercenaries on Philip, whose cavalry, the flower of Neapolitan chivalry, was completely disordered. Philip fought bravely until he was unhorsed and taken prisoner.

== Aftermath ==
With their leader captured, the Neapolitan attack melted away and Frederick marched victoriously into Trapani.
