= Battle of Ponza (1300) =

1300 naval battle of the Sicilian Vespers

Coordinates: 40.9000°N 12.9667°E

- Part of War of the Sicilian Vespers
Date	14 June 1300
Location	near Naples, present-day Italy
Result	Aragonese–Angevin victory

Belligerents
Crown of Aragon; Angevin Empire	Kingdom of Sicily

Commanders and leaders
Roger of Lauria	Conrad d'Oria

Strength
59 galleys	32 galleys

Casualties and losses
Unknown	26 galleys captured

The naval Battle of Ponza took place on 14 June 1300 near the islands of Ponza and Zannone, in the Gulf of Gaeta (north-west of Naples), when a galley fleet commanded by Roger of Lauria defeated an Aragonese-Sicilian galley fleet commanded by Conrad d'Oria.

Lauria's 40 Angevin galleys were at Naples when 32 Sicilian galleys under d'Oria arrived and challenged him to come out. For the first time he refused, probably because of a lack of confidence in his Angevin crews, and d'Oria ravaged some offshore islands. This allowed 12 Apulian galleys to arrive from the south and seven Genoese galleys to arrive also, and join Lauria's fleet, making 59 galleys. Now Lauria emerged and found the Sicilians near Zannone Island to the west. After d'Oria dismissed a suggestion to retreat, he tried a quick attack on Lauria's flag-galley and the banner-carrying galleys, his own galley running alongside Lauria's, "head to toe", and Lauria's crew suffered even though his galley couldn't be boarded. One Sicilian galley fled after capturing one of Lauria's galleys, and it was followed by six more. Five Genoese Ghibelline galleys held back, awaiting fortune, and 18-29 (two sources give 28, but this adds up to too many) Sicilian galleys were captured, d'Oria's being the last to surrender (when Lauria threatened to burn it).

== Ships involved ==
=== Aragonese and Angevin ===
- 40 Angevin (Regicolae) galleys
- 12 Apulian galleys
- 7 Genoese (Grimaldi) galleys

=== Sicilian ===
- 32 galleys - about 26 captured
