= Navy =

Military branch involved in naval warfare

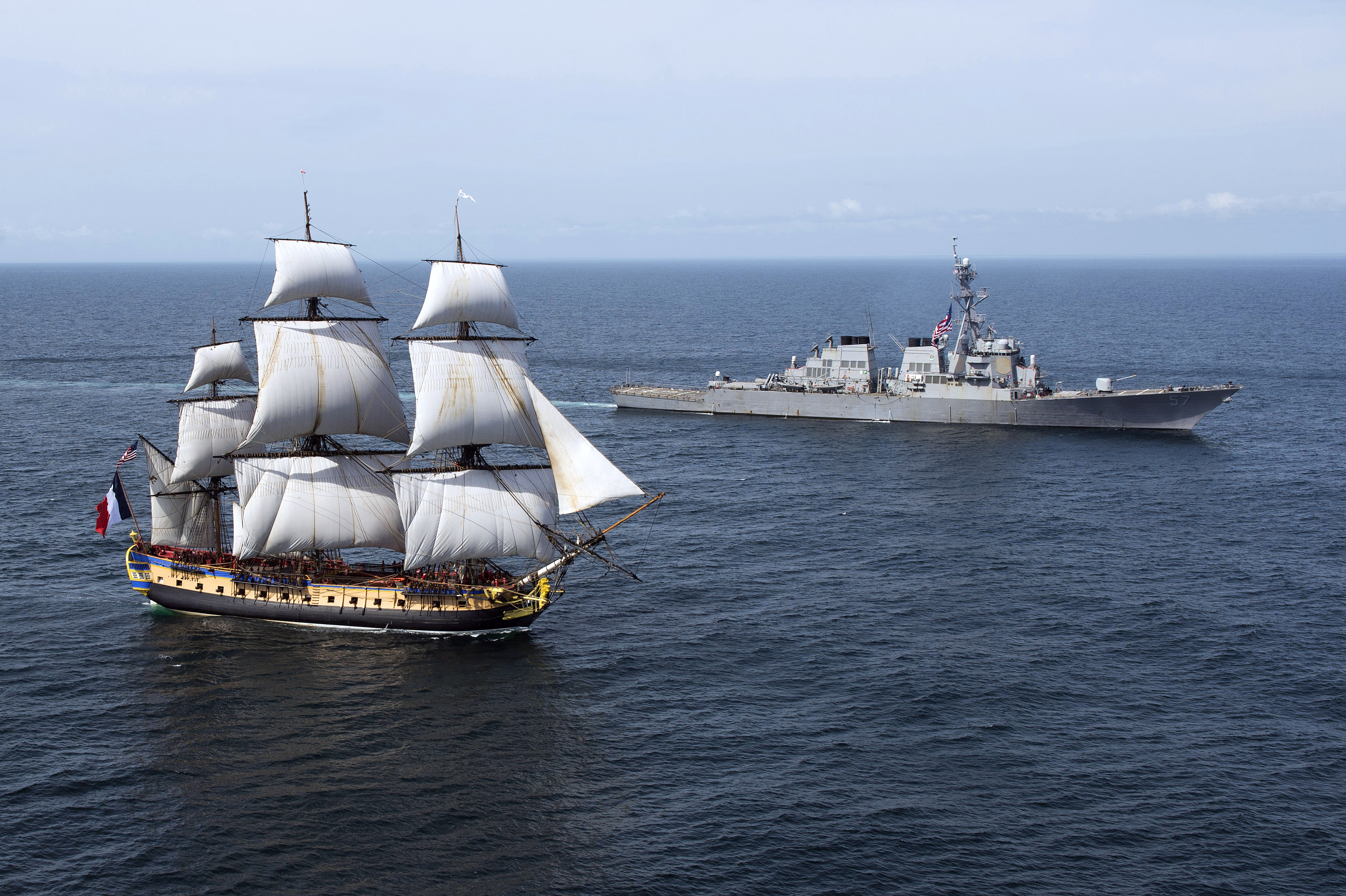
USS Mitscher, a modern guided-missile destroyer, escorting a reproduction of the 18th-century French frigate Hermione.

A navy, naval force, military maritime fleet, war navy, or maritime force is the branch of a state's armed forces principally designated for naval and amphibious warfare; namely, lake-borne, riverine, littoral, or ocean-borne combat operations and related functions. It includes anything conducted by surface ships, amphibious ships, submarines, and seaborne aviation, as well as ancillary support, communications, training, and other fields.

The strategic offensive role of a navy is projection of force into areas beyond a country's shores (for example, to protect sea-lanes, deter or confront piracy, ferry troops, or attack other navies, ports, or shore installations). The strategic defensive purpose of a navy is to frustrate seaborne projection-of-force by enemies. The strategic task of a navy also may incorporate nuclear deterrence by use of submarine-launched ballistic missiles. Naval operations can be broadly divided between riverine and littoral applications (brown-water navy), open-ocean applications (blue-water navy), and something in between (green-water navy), although these distinctions are more about strategic scope than tactical or operational division.

== Etymology and meanings ==
First attested in English in the early 14th century, the word "navy" came via Old French navie, "fleet of ships", from the Latin navigium, "a vessel, a ship, bark, boat", from navis, "ship". The word "naval" came from Latin navalis, "pertaining to ship"; cf. Greek ναῦς (naus), "ship", ναύτης (nautes), "seaman, sailor". The earliest attested form of the word is in the Mycenaean Greek compound word 𐀙𐀄𐀈𐀗, na-u-do-mo (*naudomoi), "shipbuilders", written in Linear B syllabic script. (Note: Found on the KN U 736, PY Na 568, PY Vn 865 and PY Xn 990 tablets. Cf. ναυπηγός.)

The word formerly denoted fleets of both commercial and military nature. In modern usage "navy" used alone always denotes a military fleet, although the term "merchant navy" for a commercial fleet still incorporates the non-military word sense. This overlap in word senses between commercial and military fleets grew out of the inherently dual-use nature of fleets; centuries ago, nationality was a trait that unified a fleet across both civilian and military uses. Although nationality of commercial vessels has little importance in peacetime trade other than for tax avoidance, it can have greater meaning during wartime, when supply chains become matters of patriotic attack and defense, and when in some cases private vessels are even temporarily converted to military vessels. The latter was especially important, and common, before 20th-century military technology existed, when merely adding artillery and naval infantry to any sailing vessel could render it fully as martial as any military-owned vessel. Such privateering has been rendered obsolete in blue-water strategy since modern missile and aircraft systems grew to leapfrog over artillery and infantry in many respects; but privateering nevertheless remains potentially relevant in littoral warfare of a limited and asymmetric nature.

== History ==
Naval warfare developed when humans first fought from water-borne vessels. Before the introduction of the cannon and ships with enough capacity to carry them, navy warfare primarily involved ramming and boarding actions. In the time of ancient Greece and the Roman Empire, naval warfare centered on long, narrow vessels powered by banks of oarsmen (such as triremes and quinqueremes) designed to ram and sink enemy vessels or come alongside the enemy vessel so its occupants could be attacked hand-to-hand. Naval warfare continued in this vein through the Middle Ages until the cannon became commonplace and capable of being reloaded quickly enough to be reused in the same battle.

In ancient China, large naval battles were known since the Qin dynasty (also see Battle of Red Cliffs, 208), employing the war junk during the Han dynasty. However, China's first official standing navy was not established until the Southern Song dynasty in the 12th century, a time when gunpowder was a revolutionary new application to warfare. The Chola Dynasty in Southern India had a navy composed of trade ships transporting armies overseas. The Chola Navy reached its peak under Rajendra I, and was most notably used in invasions of Sri Lanka and Southeast Asia.

Nusantaran thalassocracies made extensive use of naval power and technologies. This enabled the seafaring local people (either Malays of Srivijaya or Javanese of Mataram) to attack as far as the coast of Tanzania and Mozambique with 1000 boats and attempted to take the citadel of Qawwali, about 7,000 km to their West, in 945–946 AD. In 1350 AD Majapahit launched its largest military expedition, the invasion of Pasai, with 400 large jong and innumerable smaller vessels. The second largest military expedition, invasion of Singapura in 1398, Majapahit deployed 300 jong with no less than 200,000 men. The average jong used by Majapahit would be about 76.18–79.81 m LOA, carrying 600–700 men, with 1200–1400 tons deadweight.

The mass and deck space required to carry a large number of cannon made oar-based propulsion impossible, and ships came to rely primarily on sails. Warships were designed to carry increasing numbers of cannon and naval tactics evolved to bring a ship's firepower to bear in a broadside, with ships-of-the-line arranged in a line of battle.

The development of large capacity, sail-powered ships carrying cannon led to a rapid expansion of European navies, especially the Spanish and Portuguese navies that dominated in the 16th and early 17th centuries, and helped propel the Age of Discovery and colonialism. The repulsion of the Spanish Armada (1588) by the English fleet revolutionized naval warfare by the success of a guns-only strategy and caused a major overhaul of the Spanish Navy, partly along English lines, which resulted in even greater dominance by the Spanish. From the beginning of the 17th century the Dutch cannibalized the Portuguese Empire in the East and, with the immense wealth gained, challenged Spanish hegemony at sea. From the 1620s, Dutch raiders seriously troubled Spanish shipping and, after a number of battles that went both ways, the Dutch Navy finally broke the long dominance of the Spanish Navy in the Battle of the Downs (1639).

England emerged as a major naval power in the mid-17th century during the First Anglo-Dutch War. The Second and Third Anglo-Dutch Wars confirmed the Dutch Republic's mastery of the seas during the Dutch Golden Age, financed by the expansion of the Dutch colonial empire. The French Navy won some important victories near the end of the 17th century but a focus upon land forces led to the French Navy's relative neglect, which allowed the Royal Navy to emerge with an ever-growing advantage in size and quality, especially in tactics and experience, from 1695. As a response to growing naval influence of the navies of Portuguese, the warrior king of the Marathas, Shivaji laid the foundation of the Maratha navy in 1654.

Throughout the 18th century the Royal Navy gradually gained ascendancy over the French Navy, with victories in the War of the Spanish Succession (1701–1714), inconclusive battles in the War of the Austrian Succession (1740–1748), victories in the Seven Years' War (1754–1763), a partial reversal during the American War of Independence (1775–1783), and consolidation into uncontested supremacy during the 19th century from the Battle of Trafalgar in 1805. These conflicts saw the development and refinement of tactics that came to be called the line of battle.

The next stage in the evolution of naval warfare was the introduction of metal plating along the hull sides. The increased mass required steam-powered engines, resulting in an arms race between armor and weapon thickness and firepower. The first armored vessels, the French Gloire and British HMS Warrior, made wooden vessels obsolete. Another significant improvement came with the invention of the rotating turrets, which allowed the guns to be aimed independently of ship movement. The battle between CSS Virginia and USS Monitor during the American Civil War (1861–1865) is often cited as the beginning of this age of maritime conflict. The Russian Navy was considered the third strongest in the world on the eve of the Russo-Japanese War, which turned to be a catastrophe for the Russian military in general and the Russian Navy in particular. Although neither party lacked courage, the Russians were defeated by the Japanese in the Battle of Port Arthur, which was the first time in warfare that mines were used for offensive purposes. The warships of the Baltic Fleet sent to the Far East were lost in the Battle of Tsushima. A further step change in naval firepower occurred when the United Kingdom launched HMS Dreadnought in 1906, but naval tactics still emphasized the line of battle.

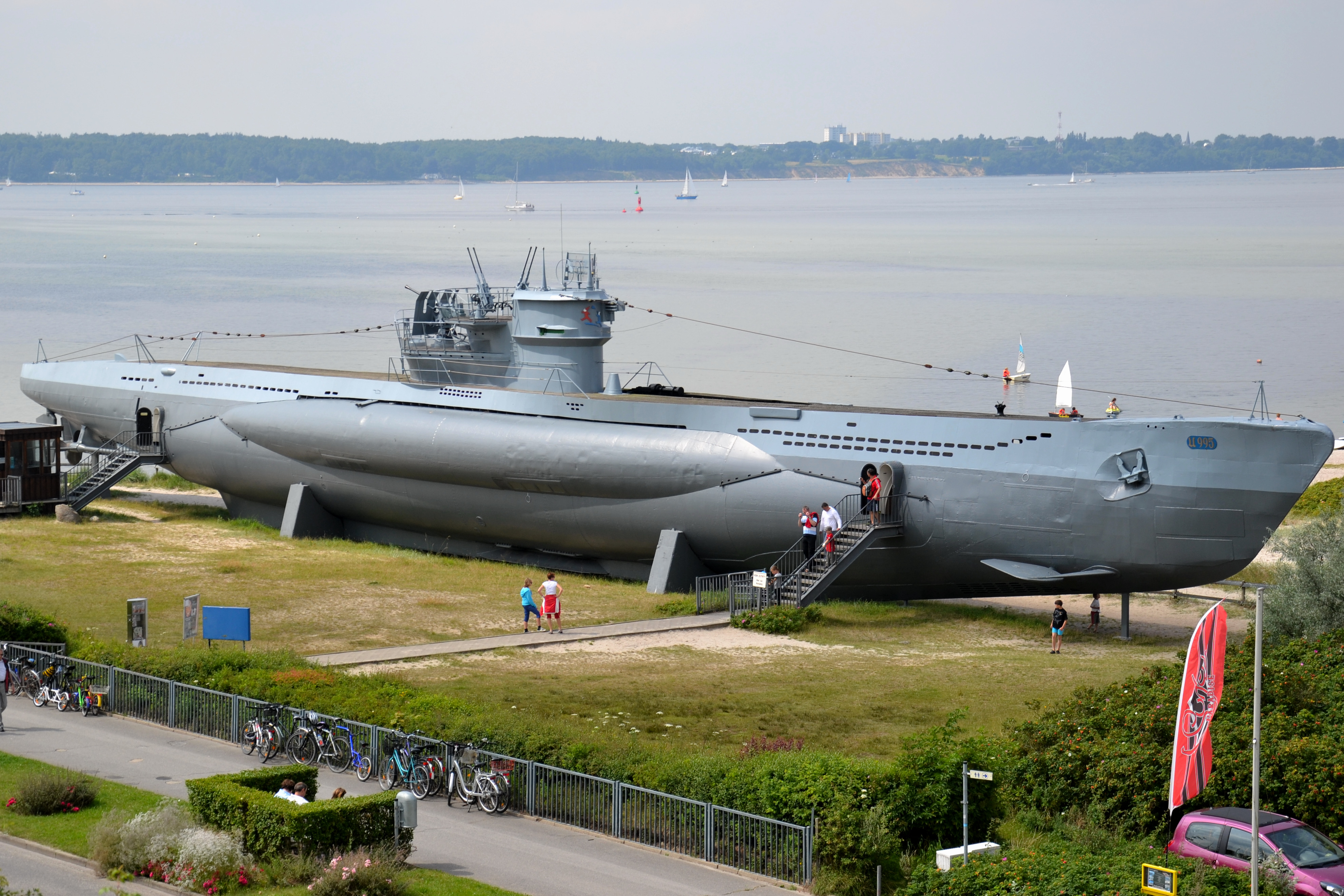
The German submarine U-995, which served during World War II, pictured in 2012.

The first practical military submarines were developed in the late 19th century and by the end of World War I had proven to be a powerful arm of naval warfare. During World War II, Nazi Germany's submarine fleet of U-boats attempted to starve the United Kingdom into submission and inflicted tremendous losses on U.S. coastal shipping. The German battleship Tirpitz, a sister ship of Bismarck, was almost put out of action by miniature submarines known as X-Craft. The X-Craft severely damaged her and kept her in port for some months.

A major paradigm shift in naval warfare occurred with the introduction of the aircraft carrier. First at Taranto in 1940 and then at Pearl Harbor in 1941, the carrier demonstrated its ability to strike decisively at enemy ships out of sight and range of surface vessels. The Battle of Leyte Gulf (1944) was arguably the largest naval battle in history; it was also the last battle in which battleships played a significant role. By the end of World War II, the carrier had become the dominant force of naval warfare.

World War II also saw the United States become by far the largest naval power in the world. In the late 20th and early 21st centuries, the United States Navy possessed over 70% of the world's total numbers and total tonnage of naval vessels of 1,000 tons or greater. Throughout the rest of the 20th century, the United States Navy would maintain a tonnage greater than that of the next 17 largest navies combined. During the Cold War, the Soviet Navy became a significant armed force, with large numbers of large, heavily armed ballistic missile submarines and extensive use of heavy, long-ranged antisurface missiles to counter the numerous United States carrier battle groups. Only three countries, the United States, France and China presently operate CATOBAR carriers of any size, while Russia and India operate sizeable STOBAR carriers (although both are originally of Soviet design). The United Kingdom is also operating two Queen Elizabeth-class carriers, which are the largest STOVL vessels in service, and India is currently building one aircraft carrier, INS Vikrant, and considering another. France is also looking at a new carrier, probably using a CATOBAR system and possibly based on the British Queen Elizabeth design.

== Operations ==
A navy typically operates from one or more naval bases. The base is a port that is specialized in naval operations, and often includes housing, a munitions depot, docks for the vessels, and various repair facilities. During times of war temporary bases may be constructed in closer proximity to strategic locations, as it is advantageous in terms of patrols and station-keeping. States with historically strong naval forces have found it advantageous to obtain basing rights in other countries in areas of strategic interest.

Navy ships can operate independently or with a group, which may be a small squadron of comparable ships, or a larger naval fleet of various specialized ships. The commander of a fleet travels in the flagship, which is usually the most powerful vessel in the group. Before radio was invented, commands from the flagship were communicated by means of flags. At night signal lamps could be used for a similar purpose. Later these were replaced by the radio transmitter, or the flashing light when radio silence was needed.

A "blue water navy" is designed to operate far from the coastal waters of its home nation. These are ships capable of maintaining station for long periods of time in deep ocean, and will have a long logistical tail for their support. Many are also nuclear powered to save having to refuel. By contrast a "brown water navy" operates in the coastal periphery and along inland waterways, where larger ocean-going naval vessels can not readily enter. Regional powers may maintain a "green water navy" as a means of localized force projection. Blue water fleets may require specialized vessels, such as minesweepers, when operating in the littoral regions along the coast.

== Traditions ==
A basic tradition is that all ships commissioned in a navy are referred to as ships rather than vessels, with the exception of destroyers and submarines, which are known as boats. The prefix on a ship's name indicates that it is a commissioned ship.

An important tradition on board naval vessels of some nations has been the ship's bell. This was historically used to mark the passage of time, as warning devices in heavy fog, and for alarms and ceremonies.

The ship's captain, and more senior officers are "piped" aboard the ship using a Boatswain's call.

In the United States, the First Navy Jack is a flag that has the words, "Don't Tread on Me" on the flag.

By English tradition, ships have been referred to as a "she". However, it was long considered bad luck to permit women to sail on board naval vessels. To do so would invite a terrible storm that would wreck the ship. The only women that were welcomed on board were figureheads mounted on the prow of the ship.

Firing a cannon salute partially disarms the ship, so firing a cannon for no combat reason showed respect and trust. As the tradition evolved, the number of cannons fired became an indication of the rank of the official being saluted.

== Naval organization ==
=== Ships ===
Historically, navy ships were primarily intended for warfare. They were designed to withstand damage and to inflict the same, but only carried munitions and supplies for the voyage (rather than merchant cargo). Often, other ships that were not built specifically for warfare, such as the galleon or the armed merchant ships in World War II, did carry armaments. In more recent times, navy ships have become more specialized and have included supply ships, troop transports, repair ships, oil tankers and other logistics support ships as well as combat ships.

Modern navy combat ships are generally divided into seven main categories: aircraft carriers, cruisers, destroyers, frigates, corvettes, submarines, and amphibious assault ships. There are also support and auxiliary ships, including the oiler, minesweeper, patrol boat, hydrographic and oceanographic survey ship and tender. During the Age of Sail, the ship categories were divided into the ship of the line, frigate, and sloop-of-war.

Naval ship names are typically prefixed by an abbreviation indicating the national navy in which they serve. For a list of the prefixes used with ship names (HMS, USS, LÉ, etc.) see ship prefix.

Today's warships are significantly faster than in years past, thanks to much improved propulsion systems. Also, the efficiency of the engines has improved, in terms of fuel, and of how many sailors it takes to operate them. In World War II, ships needed to refuel very often. However, today ships can go on very long journeys without refueling. Also, in World War II, the engine room needed about a dozen sailors to work the many engines, however, today, only about four or five are needed (depending on the class of the ship). Today, naval strike groups on longer missions are always followed by a range of support and replenishment ships supplying them with anything from fuel and munitions, to medical treatment and postal services. This allows strike groups and combat ships to remain at sea for several months at a time.

=== Boats ===
The term "boat" refers to small craft limited in their use by size and usually not capable of making lengthy independent voyages at sea. The old navy adage to differentiate between ships and boats is that boats are capable of being carried by ships. (Submarines by this rule are ships rather than boats, but are customarily referred to as boats reflecting their previous smaller size.)

Navies use many types of boat, ranging from 9-foot (2.7 m) dinghies to 135-foot (41 m) landing craft. They are powered by either diesel engines, out-board gasoline engines, or waterjets. Most boats are built of aluminum, fiberglass, or steel. Rigid-hulled inflatable boats are also used.

Patrol boats are used for patrols of coastal areas, lakes and large rivers.

Landing craft are designed to carry troops, vehicles, or cargo from ship to shore under combat conditions, to unload, to withdraw from the beach, and to return to the ship. They are rugged, with powerful engines, and usually armed. There are many types in today's navies including hovercraft. They will typically have a power-operated bow ramp, a cargo well and after structures that house engine rooms, pilot houses, and stowage compartments. These boats are sometimes carried by larger ships.

Special operations craft are high-speed craft used for insertion and extraction of special forces personnel and some may be transportable (and deployed) by air.

Boats used in non-combat roles include lifeboats, mail boats, line handling boats, buoy boats, aircraft rescue boats, torpedo retrievers, explosive ordnance disposal craft, utility boats, dive boats, targets, and work boats. Boats are also used for survey work, tending divers, and minesweeping operations. Boats for carrying cargo and personnel are sometimes known as launches, gigs, barges or shore party boats.

=== Units ===
Naval forces are typically arranged into units based on the number of ships included, a single ship being the smallest operational unit. Ships may be combined into squadrons or flotillas, which may be formed into fleets. The largest unit size may be the whole Navy or Admiralty.

A task force can be assembled using ships from different fleets for an operational task.

=== Personnel ===
Despite their acceptance in many areas of naval service, female sailors were not permitted to serve on board U.S. submarines until the U.S. Navy lifted the ban in April 2010. The major reasons historically cited by the U.S. Navy were the extended duty tours and close conditions which afford almost no privacy. The United Kingdom's Royal Navy has had similar restrictions. Australia, Canada, Norway, and Spain previously opened submarine service to women sailors.

=== Ranks ===
A navy will typically have two sets of ranks, one for enlisted personnel and one for officers.

Typical ranks for commissioned officers include the following, in ascending order (Commonwealth ranks are listed first on each line; USA ranks are listed second in those instances where they differ from Commonwealth ranks):

- Midshipman / Ensign / Corvette Lieutenant / Second Lieutenant
- Sub Lieutenant / Lieutenant Junior Grade / Frigate Lieutenant / First Lieutenant
- Lieutenant (Commonwealth & US)/ Ship-of-the-Line Lieutenant / Captain Lieutenant / Captain
- Lieutenant Commander (Commonwealth & US)/ Corvette Captain / Major
- Commander (Commonwealth & US)/ Frigate Captain / Lieutenant Colonel
- Captain (Commonwealth & US)/ Ship-of-the-Line Captain / Colonel
- Commodore / Flotilla Admiral (in US only: Rear Admiral (lower half))
- Rear Admiral (in US only: Rear Admiral (upper half))
- Vice Admiral (Commonwealth & US)
- Admiral (Commonwealth & US)
- Admiral of the Fleet (Commonwealth) / Fleet Admiral (US) / Grand Admiral

"Flag officers" include any rank that includes the word "admiral" (or commodore in services other than the US Navy), and are generally in command of a battle group, strike group or similar flotilla of ships, rather than a single ship or aspect of a ship. However, commodores can also be temporary or honorary positions. For example, during World War II, a Navy captain was assigned duty as a convoy commodore, which meant that he was still a captain, but in charge of all the merchant vessels in the convoy.

The most senior rank employed by a navy will tend to vary depending on the size of a navy and whether it is wartime or peacetime, for example, few people have ever held the rank of Fleet Admiral in the U.S. Navy, the chief of the Royal Australian Navy holds the rank of Vice Admiral, and the chief of the Irish Naval Service holds the rank of Commodore.

== Naval infantry ==
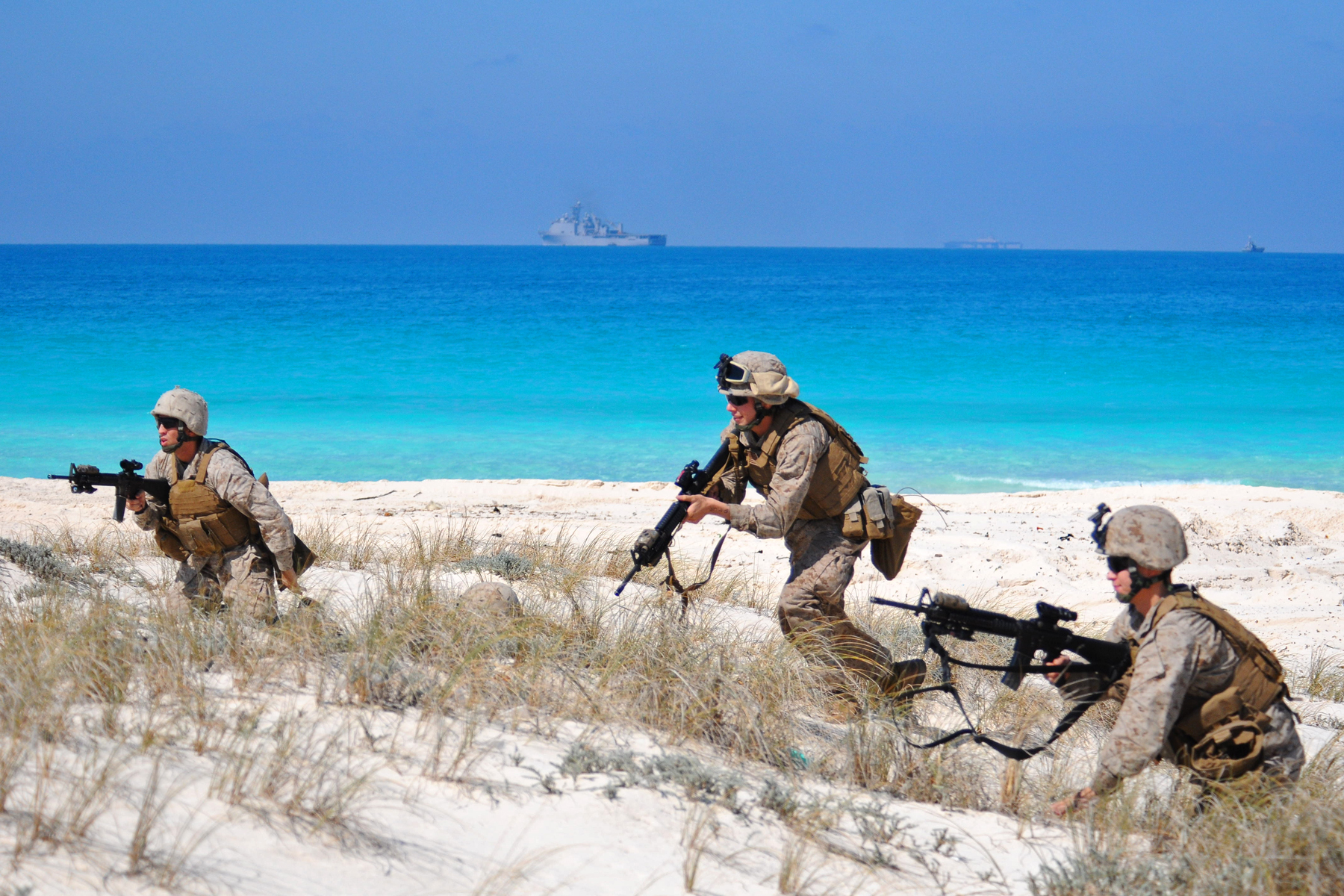
US 22nd Marine Expeditionary Unit conducting a beach landing exercise.

Naval infantry, commonly known as marines, are a category of infantry that form part of a state's naval forces and perform roles on land and at sea, including amphibious operations, as well as other, naval roles. They also perform other tasks, including land warfare, separate from naval operations.

During the era of the Roman Empire, naval forces included marine legionaries for maritime boarding actions. These were troops primarily trained in land warfare, and did not need to be skilled at handling a ship. Much later during the age of sail, a component of marines served a similar role, being ship-borne soldiers who were used either during boarding actions, as sharp-shooters, or in raids along shorelines.

The Spanish Infantería de Marina was formed in 1537, making it the oldest, current marine force in the world. The British Royal Marines combine being both a ship-based force and also being specially trained in commando frogman-style operations and tactics, operating in some cases separately from the rest of the Royal Navy. The Royal Marines also have their own special forces unit.

In the majority of countries, the marine force is an integral part of the navy but there are variations such as the French Troupes de marine, which is actually part of the French Army. The United States Marine Corps is a separate armed service within the United States Department of the Navy, with its own leadership structure.

== Naval aviation ==
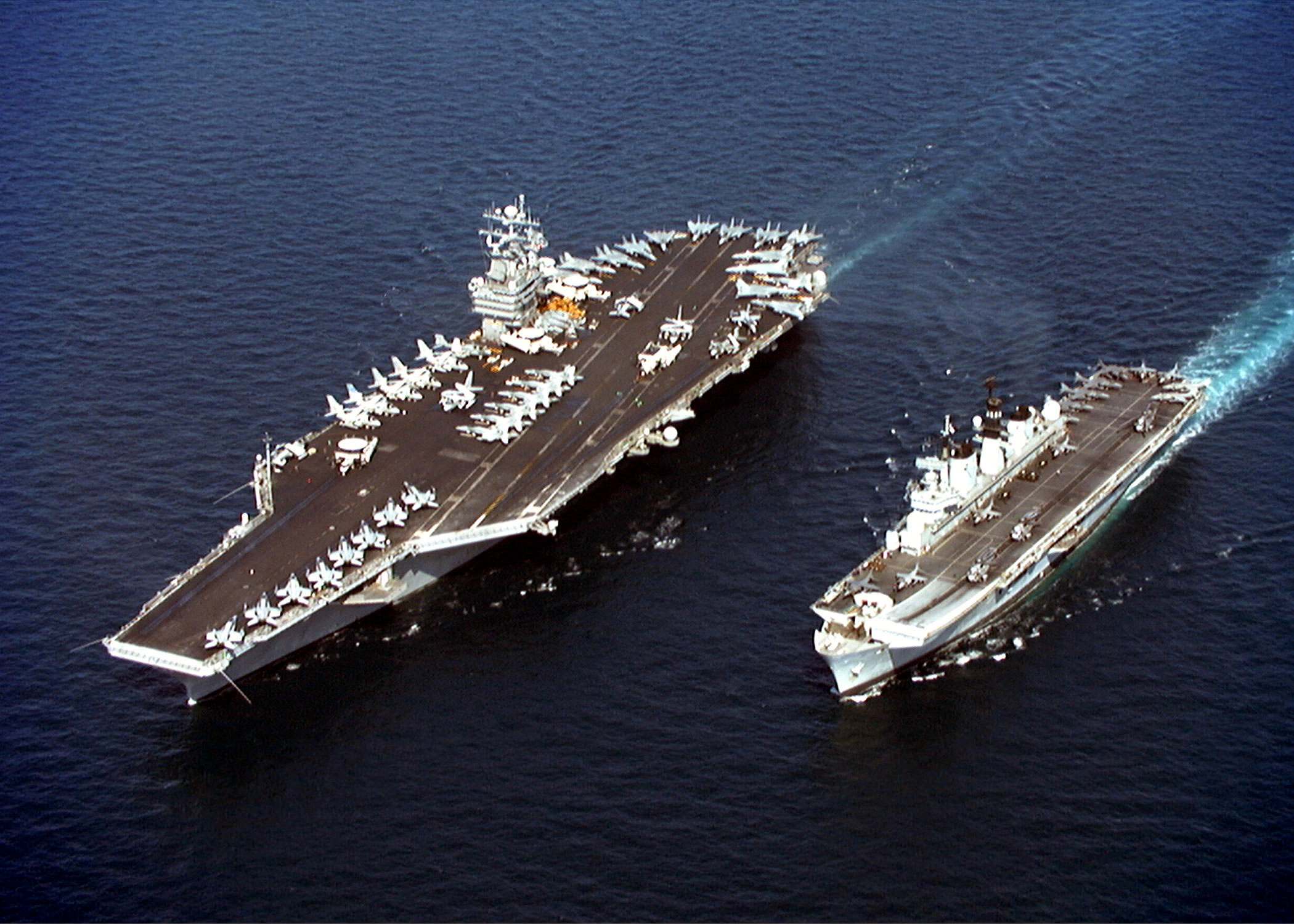
USS John C. Stennis (left) and HMS Illustrious.

Naval aviation is the application of military air power by navies, whether from warships that embark aircraft, or land bases.

In World War I, several navies used floatplanes and flying boats – mainly for scouting. By World War II, aircraft carriers could carry bomber aircraft capable of attacking naval and land targets, as well as fighter aircraft for defence. Since World War II helicopters have been embarked on smaller ships in roles such as anti-submarine warfare and transport. Some navies have also operated land-based aircraft in roles such as maritime patrol and training.

Naval aviation forces primarily perform naval roles at sea. However, they are also used in a variety of other roles.

== See also ==
- Blue-water navy
- Coast guard
- List of auxiliary ship classes in service
- List of countries by level of military equipment
- List of naval battles
- List of naval ship classes in service
- List of navies
- List of submarine classes in service
- Naval academy
- Naval fleet
- Naval militia
- Naval tactics
- Naval warfare
- Navies of landlocked countries
- Shore patrol

== Notes and references ==
=== References ===
- de Crespigny, Rafe (2018) [1990]. Generals of the South: The Foundation and Early History of the Three Kingdoms State of Wu (Internet ed.). Canberra: Australian National University. ISBN 978-0-7315-0901-0.
- Spencer, George W. (1976). "The Politics of Plunder: The Cholas in Eleventh-Century Ceylon". The Journal of Asian Studies. 35 (3): 405–419. doi:10.2307/2053272. ISSN 0021-9118. JSTOR 2053272. S2CID 154741845.
