= Sailing ship tactics =

Naval tactics of sailing ships

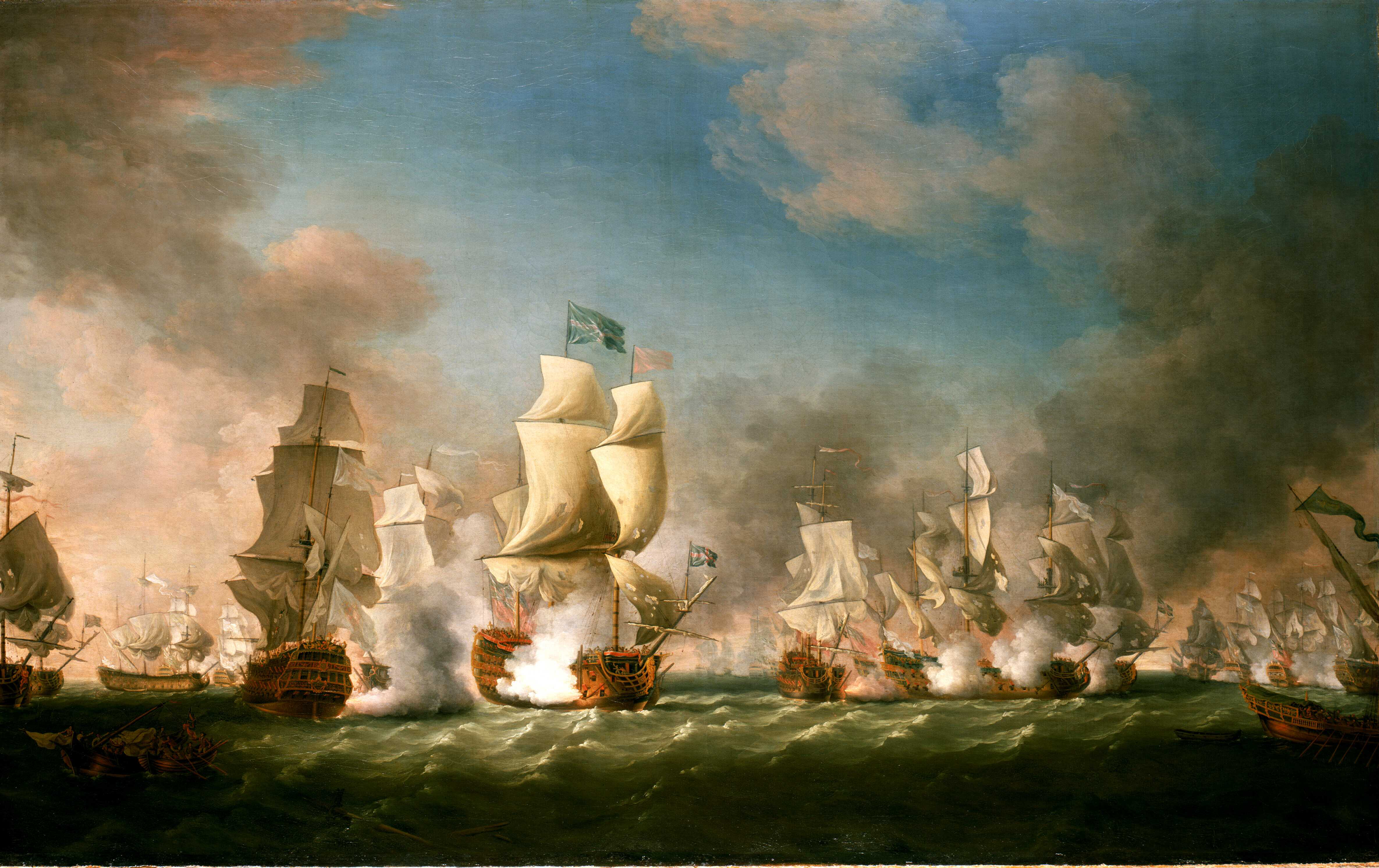
A painting of the Battle of Cape Passaro, showcasing broadside and raking fire tactics

Sailing ship tactics were the naval tactics employed by sailing ships in contrast to oared vessel tactics. This article focuses on the Age of Sail, a period from c. 1500 to the mid-19th century, after which sailing warships were replaced with steam-powered ironclads.

== Overview ==
=== Early history ===
Since ancient times, war at sea had been fought much as on land: with melee weapons and bows and arrows, but on floating wooden platforms rather than battlefields. Though the introduction of guns was a significant change, it only slowly changed the dynamics of ship-to-ship combat. The first guns on ships were small wrought-iron pieces mounted on the open decks and in the fighting tops, often requiring only one or two men to handle them. They were designed to injure, kill or simply stun, shock and frighten the enemy prior to boarding. As guns were made more durable to withstand stronger gunpowder charges, they increased their potential to inflict critical damage to the vessel rather than just its crew. Since these guns were much heavier than the earlier anti-personnel weapons, they had to be placed lower in the ships, and fire from gunports, to avoid ships becoming unstable. In Northern Europe the technique of building ships with clinker planking made it difficult to cut ports in the hull; clinker-built (or clench-built) ships had much of their structural strength in the outer hull. The solution was the gradual adoption of carvel-built ships that relied on an internal skeleton structure to bear the weight of the ship. The development of propulsion during the 15th century from single-masted, square-rigged cogs to three-masted carracks with a mix of square and lateen sails made ships nimbler and easier to manoeuvre.

Gunports cut in the hull of ships had been introduced as early as 1501. According to tradition the inventor was a Breton shipwright called Descharges, but it is just as likely to have been a gradual adaptation of loading ports in the stern of merchant vessels that had already been in use for centuries. Initially, the gunports were used to mount heavy so-called stern chasers pointing aft, but soon gunports migrated to the sides of ships. This made possible for the first time in history coordinated volleys from all the guns on one side of a ship, broadsides, at least in theory. Guns in the 16th century were considered to be in fixed positions and were intended to be fired independently rather than in concerted volleys. It was not until the 1590s that the word "broadside" in English was commonly used to refer to gunfire from the side of a ship rather than the ship's side itself.

Naval tactics throughout the 16th century and well into the 17th century were focused on countering the oar-powered galleys that were armed with forward-facing heavy guns in the bow, which were aimed by turning the entire ship against its target. Though far less seaworthy than sailing vessels and highly vulnerable to boarding by ships that rode higher in the water, the galleys were a serious threat due to their ability to aim accurate heavy gunfire low in the hulls of larger sailing ships and to escape solely sail-powered opponents by rowing into the wind.

=== Initial tactics ===
The line of battle tactic that allowed efficient use of broadside fire was not put into general use until the mid-17th century, as was described by English General at Sea Robert Blake in his Laws of War and Ordinances of the Sea. The previous solution was to make sailing ships fire backwards from the stern, as a defensive measure, or forward from the bow, as an offensive measure. The latter was only partially achieved either by canting (angling) the side guns towards the bow or stern as far as the ship's structure would allow, or by placing guns on the sterncastle and firing them in an arc on either side of the forecastle. Both solutions were problematic since they created a blind spot dead ahead and made it especially difficult to hit low-lying targets, like galleys. The method that was deemed most effective by contemporaries was to simply counter the threat of galleys with other galleys.

Despite the technical innovations, naval cannon fire also remained grossly inaccurate except at very close ranges. Difficulties in achieving standardization in metallurgy meant that all guns allowed for considerable "windage", meaning that bore diameters were about 10 percent larger than their ammunition. Combined with inefficient gunpowder and the difficulties inherent in firing accurately from moving platforms meant that naval tactics for sailing ships throughout the 16th century remained focused on boarding as a means of decisive victory.

Naval tactics in the Age of Sail were primarily determined by the sailing and fighting qualities of the sailing warships of the time. Three factors, in particular, constrained what a sailing admiral could order his fleet to do.

- The first constraint was that like all sailing vessels, sailing warships could not sail directly into the wind. Most could sail not much closer than 70 degrees off the wind. This limited the maneuverability of a fleet during battles at close quarters. Holding the weather gage, i.e. being upwind of one's opponent, conferred considerable tactical advantages.
- The second constraint was that the ships of the time carried their guns in two large batteries, one on each broadside, with only a few mounted to fire directly ahead or astern. The sailing warship was immensely powerful on its sides, but very weak on its bow and stern. The sides of the ship were built with strong timbers, but the stern, in particular, was fragile with a flimsy structure around the large windows of the officers' cabins. The bow and, particularly, the stern of the ship were vulnerable to raking fire. Raking another ship by firing the length of a ship from either the bow or stern caused tremendous damage, because a single shot would fly down the length of the decks, while the ship being raked could not return fire with its broadsides. Moreover, the externally mounted rudder was at the stern, and any hit there would render the ship essentially unsteerable and without the ability to maneuver, even with masts and sails intact.
- The third constraint was the difficulty of communicating at sea. Written communication was almost impossible in a moving fleet, while hailing was extremely difficult above the noise of wind and weather. Admirals were forced to rely on a pre-arranged set of signal flags hoisted aboard the admiral's flagship. In the smoke of battle, these were often hard or impossible to see.

The 16th century saw the development of the man-of-war, a truly ocean-going warship, carrying square-rigged sails that permitted tacking into the wind, and heavily armed with cannons. The adoption of heavy guns necessitated their being mounted lower down than on top of the fore and after castles as previously where anti-personnel weapons had been positioned through the later Middle Ages, due to the possibility of capsizing. This meant that what had earlier been the hold of a ship that could be used either as a merchant ship or warship was now full with cannon and ammunition. Hence ships became specialised as warships, which would lead to a standing fleet instead of one based on placing temporary contracts.

The man-of-war eventually rendered the galley obsolete except for operations close to shore in calm weather. With the development of the sailing man-of-war, and the beginning of the great sailing fleets capable of keeping at sea for long periods together, came the need for a new adaptation of old principles of naval tactics.

A ship that depended on the wind for its motive power could not hope to ram. A sailing vessel could not ram unless it was running before a good breeze. In a light wind, the charge would be ineffective, and it could not be made at all from leeward. It could still board, and the Spanish did for long make it their main object to run their bow over an enemy's sides and invade the deck. In order to carry out this kind of attack they would naturally try to get to windward and then bear down before the wind in line abreast ship upon ship. But an opponent to leeward could always baffle this attack by edging away, and in the meantime fire with his broadside to cripple his opponent's spars.

An important organizational innovation was made by Sir Francis Drake. Prior to his leadership, a warship was typically run by a committee of the sailing master, navigator, master-gunner, and captain of marines presided over by an aristocrat. Drake saw no purpose in having a member of the aristocracy without specialist knowledge and established the principle that the captain of the ship would be in sole command based upon his skill and experience rather than social position. This transformation was never quite made in the Spanish Navy where the "gentlemen" continued to obstruct operations throughout the Age of Sail.

The Revolutionary French Navy made an opposite mistake in promoting seamen without sufficient experience or training, which worked well in the army, but not at sea. The Royal Navy by contrast was well served by many distinguished commanders of middle-class origin, such as Horatio Nelson (son of a parson), Jervis (son of a solicitor) or Collingwood (son of a butcher) as well as by aristocrats who proved themselves at sea such as Thomas Cochrane and even members of the working-class, such as John Benbow.

== Line of battle ==
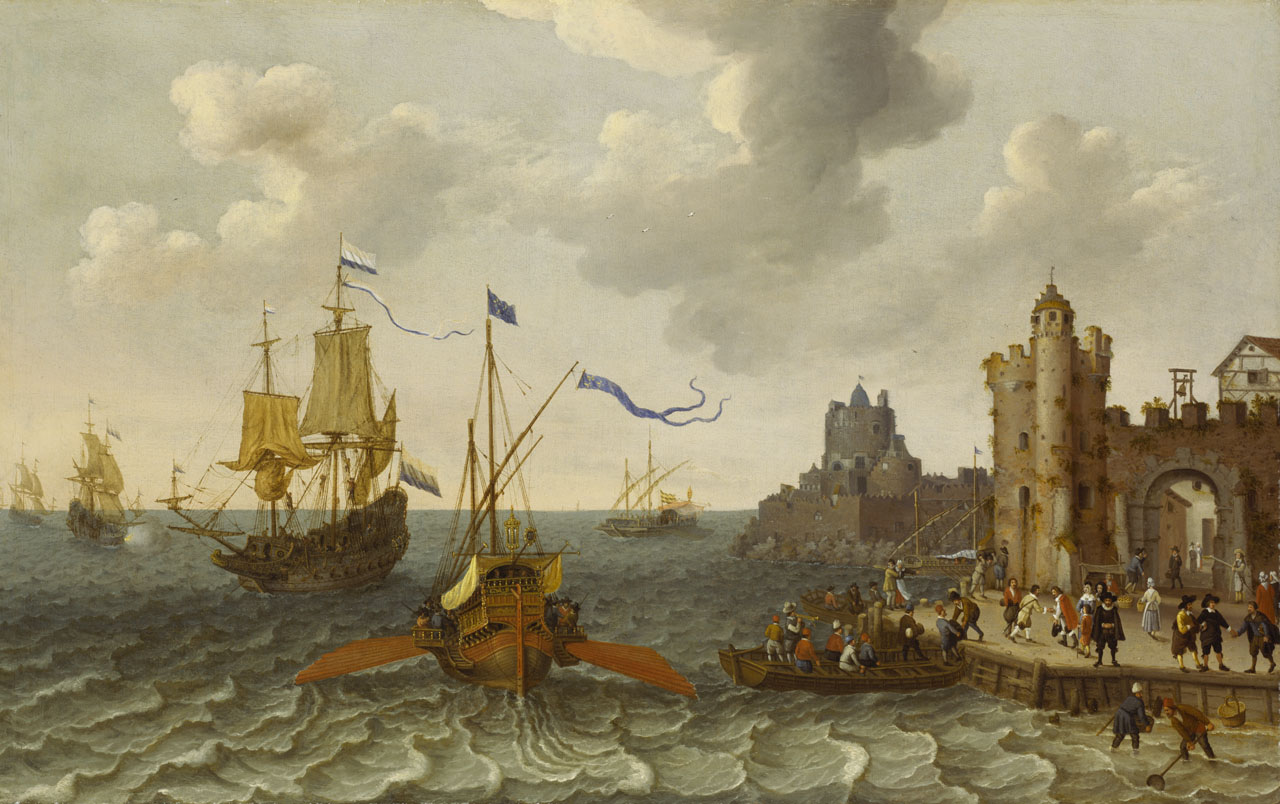
A French galley and Dutch man-of-war off a port by Abraham Willaerts, painted 17th century.

The first recorded mention of the use of a line of battle tactic is attested from 1500. The Instructions provided in 1500 by King Manuel I of Portugal to the commander of a fleet dispatched to the Indian Ocean suggests its use predated the written instructions. Portuguese fleets overseas deployed in line ahead, firing one broadside and then putting about in order to return and discharge the other, resolving battles by gunnery alone. In a treatise of 1555, The Art of War at Sea, Portuguese theorist on naval warfare and shipbuilding, Fernão de Oliveira, recognized that at sea, the Portuguese "fight at a distance, as if from walls and fortresses...". He recommended the single line ahead as the ideal combat formation.

An early line of battle tactic had been used by the Fourth Portuguese India Armada in the Battle of Calicut, under Vasco da Gama in 1502, near Malabar, against a Muslim fleet. One of the earliest recorded deliberate uses is also documented in the First Battle of Cannanore between the Third Portuguese India Armada under João da Nova and the naval forces of Calicut, earlier in the same year. This early use of this strategy also consisted in its implementation, in both battles, on only one side of the contenders.

The evolution of naval cannons during the first half of the 17th century soon led to the conclusion that the fleet had to fight in a single line to make the maximum use of its firepower without one ship's getting in the way of another.

The line of battle was traditionally attributed to the navy of the Commonwealth of England and especially to General at Sea Robert Blake who wrote the Sailing and Fighting Instructions of 1653. One of the first documented deliberate uses seems to be somewhat earlier in the action of 18 September 1639 by Dutch Lieutenant-Admiral Maarten Tromp against the Spanish. The tactic was used by both sides in the Anglo-Dutch Wars, and was codified in written 'fighting instructions'. These formed the basis of the whole tactical system of the 17th and 18th centuries in naval warfare.

One consequence of the line of battle was that a ship had to be strong enough to stand in it. In the old type of mêlée battle a small ship could seek out an opponent of her own size, or combine with others to attack a larger one. As the line of battle was adopted, navies began to distinguish between vessels that were fit to form parts of the line in action, and smaller ships that were not. By the time the line of battle was firmly established as the standard tactical formation during the 1660s, merchant ships and lightly armed warships became less able to sustain their place in a pitched battle. In the line of battle, each ship had to stand and fight the opposing ship in the enemy line, however powerful she might be. A purpose-built warship large and powerful enough to stand in the line of battle came to be known as a ship of the line.

== Importance of the weather gage ==
Holding the weather, or windward, gage conferred several important tactical advantages. The admiral holding the weather gage held the tactical initiative, able to accept battle by bearing down on his opponent or to refuse it by remaining upwind. The fleet with the lee gage could avoid battle by withdrawing to leeward, but could not force action. Even retreating downwind could be difficult once two fleets were at close quarters because the ships risked being raked as they turned downwind. A second disadvantage of the leeward gage was that in anything more than a light wind, a sailing ship that is sailing close hauled (or beating) will heel to leeward under the pressure of the wind on its sails. The ships of a fleet on the leeward gage heel away from their opponents, exposing part of their bottoms to shot. If a ship is penetrated in an area of the hull that is normally under water, she is then in danger of taking on water or even sinking when on the other tack. This is known as "hulled between wind and water". Finally, smoke from the gunfire of the ships to windward would blow down on the fleet on the leeward gage. It was common for battles to involve days of manoeuvring as one admiral strove to take the weather gage from his opponent in order to force him to action, as at the battles of Ushant (1778), St Lucia Channel (1780) and the First of June (1794).

Only in heavy weather could the windward gage become a disadvantage, because the lower gun ports on the leeward side of a ship would be awash, preventing her from opening her lower-deck ports to use the guns – or risking being swamped if she did. So, in strong winds, a ship attacking from windward would not be able to bring her heavy lower-deck guns into action, while the enemy ship to leeward would have no such problem as the guns on her windward side would be raised by the heel. For this reason, Admiral Rodney ordered his ships to attack the Spanish from leeward in the stormy weather at the Battle of Cape St. Vincent in 1780.

== Development of tactics in the French Navy ==
In the French Navy, sailing tactics were developed by the treatises of the French tacticians Paul Hoste, Bigot de Morogues and Bourde de Villehuet, which developed the traditional code of practice and were all translated into other languages. During the 18th century, French governments developed the strategic doctrine of focusing on the mission, rather than fighting for command of the sea. The French government was often reluctant to take tactical risks to achieve its strategic objectives. The navy was hampered by the timidity of its orders. French fleets and squadrons typically sought to avoid battle rather than risk a contest with a British force, as De Ternay did in June 1780 on meeting a smaller British squadron under Cornwallis off Bermuda. This strategy had important tactical ramifications. French ships tended to fire at the rigging of their opponents to disable them and allow the French ships to escape and continue with their mission. French ships typically fired their broadsides on the upward roll of the ship, disabling their opponents but doing little damage to the enemy ships or their crews. This was compounded by the French tendency to fight from the leeward gage, causing the guns to point high as the ships heeled with the wind. British and Dutch ships, by contrast, tended to use the opposite tactic of firing on the downward roll into the enemy hulls, causing a storm of flying splinters that killed and maimed the enemy gun crews. This difference in tactics goes some way to explaining the difference in casualty figures between British and French crews, with French fleets tending to suffer not only more casualties but also a higher proportion of killed than wounded.

== Tactical stagnation in the mid-18th century ==
When the conflict came to be between the British and the French in the 18th century, battles between equal or approximately equal forces became largely inconclusive. The French, who had fewer ships than the British throughout the century, were anxious to fight at the least possible cost, lest their fleet should be worn out by severe action, leaving Britain with an unreachable numerical superiority. Therefore, they preferred to engage to leeward, a position which left them free to retreat before the wind. They allowed the British fleet to get to windward, and when it was parallel with them and bore up before the wind to attack, they moved onwards. The attacking fleet had then to advance, not directly before the wind with its ships moving along lines perpendicular to the line attacked, but in slanting or curving lines. The assailants would be thrown into "a bow and quarter line" – with the bow of the second level with the after part of the first and so on from end to end. In the case of a number of ships of various powers of sailing, it was a difficult formation to maintain.

The result was often that the ships of the attacking line which were steering to attack the enemy's centre came into action first and were liable to be crippled in the rigging. If the same formation was to be maintained, the others were now limited to the speed of the injured vessels, and the enemy to leeward slipped away. At all times a fleet advancing from windward was liable to injury in spars, even if the leeward fleet did not deliberately aim at them. The leeward ships would be leaning away from the wind, and their shot would always have a tendency to fly high. So long as the assailant remained to windward, the ships to leeward could always slip off.

The wars of the 18th century produced a series of tactically indecisive naval battles between evenly matched fleets in line ahead, such as Málaga (1704), Rügen (1715), Toulon (1744), Minorca (1756), Negapatam (1758), Cuddalore (1758), Pondicherry (1759), Ushant (1778), Dogger Bank (1781), the Chesapeake (1781), Hogland (1788) and Öland (1789). Although a few of these battles had important strategic consequences, like the Chesapeake which the British needed to win, all were tactically indecisive. Many admirals began to believe that a contest between two equally matched fleets could not produce a decisive result. The tactically decisive actions of the first four-fifths of the 18th century were all chase actions, where one fleet was clearly superior to the other, such as the two battles of Finisterre (1747), and those at Lagos (1759), Quiberon Bay (1759) and Cape St. Vincent (1780).

British naval innovation was further slowed by an unseemly dispute between two admirals in the aftermath of the Battle of Toulon. The British fleet under Admiral Thomas Mathews had been unable to draw level with the French fleet, but Mathews nevertheless ordered an attack, intending all the British ships to attack the French rear. He had no signals by which he could communicate his intentions, and the rear squadron under Vice Admiral Richard Lestock, his rival and second-in-command, obtusely remained at the prescribed intervals in line ahead, far to the rear of the action. A subsequent series of courts-martial, in which political influence was brought to bear by Lestock's friends in Parliament, punished Mathews and those captains who had supported him in the battle, and vindicated Lestock. In several future actions, admirals who were tempted to deviate from the Admiralty's fighting instructions were reminded of Mathews's fate.

== Developments during the American War of Independence ==
The unsatisfactory character of the accepted method of fighting battles at sea had begun to be obvious to naval officers, both French and British, by the later 18th century and began to be addressed during the numerous battles of the American War of Independence. It was clear that the only way to produce decisive results was to concentrate the attack on part of the enemy's line, preferably the rear since the centre would have to turn to its support.

The great French admiral Suffren condemned naval tactics as being little better than so many excuses for avoiding a real fight. He endeavoured to find a better method, by concentrating superior forces on parts of his opponent's line in some of his actions with the British fleet in the East Indies in 1782 and 1783, such as the Battle of Sadras where Suffren tried to double the rear of the British line. But his orders were ill obeyed, his opponent Sir Edward Hughes was competent, and the quality of his fleet was not superior to the British.

Similarly, the British admiral Rodney, in the Battle of Martinique in the West Indies in 1780, tried to concentrate a superior force on part of his enemy's line by throwing a greater number of British ships on the rear of the French line. But his directions were misunderstood and not properly executed. Moreover, he did not then go beyond trying to place a larger number of ships in action to windward against a smaller number to leeward by arranging them at a lesser distance than two-cables length. An enemy who took the simple and obvious course of closing his line could baffle the attack, and while the retreat to leeward remained open could still slip away. Like Suffren, Rodney was a great tactician, but a difficult man to work with who failed to explain his intentions to his subordinates.

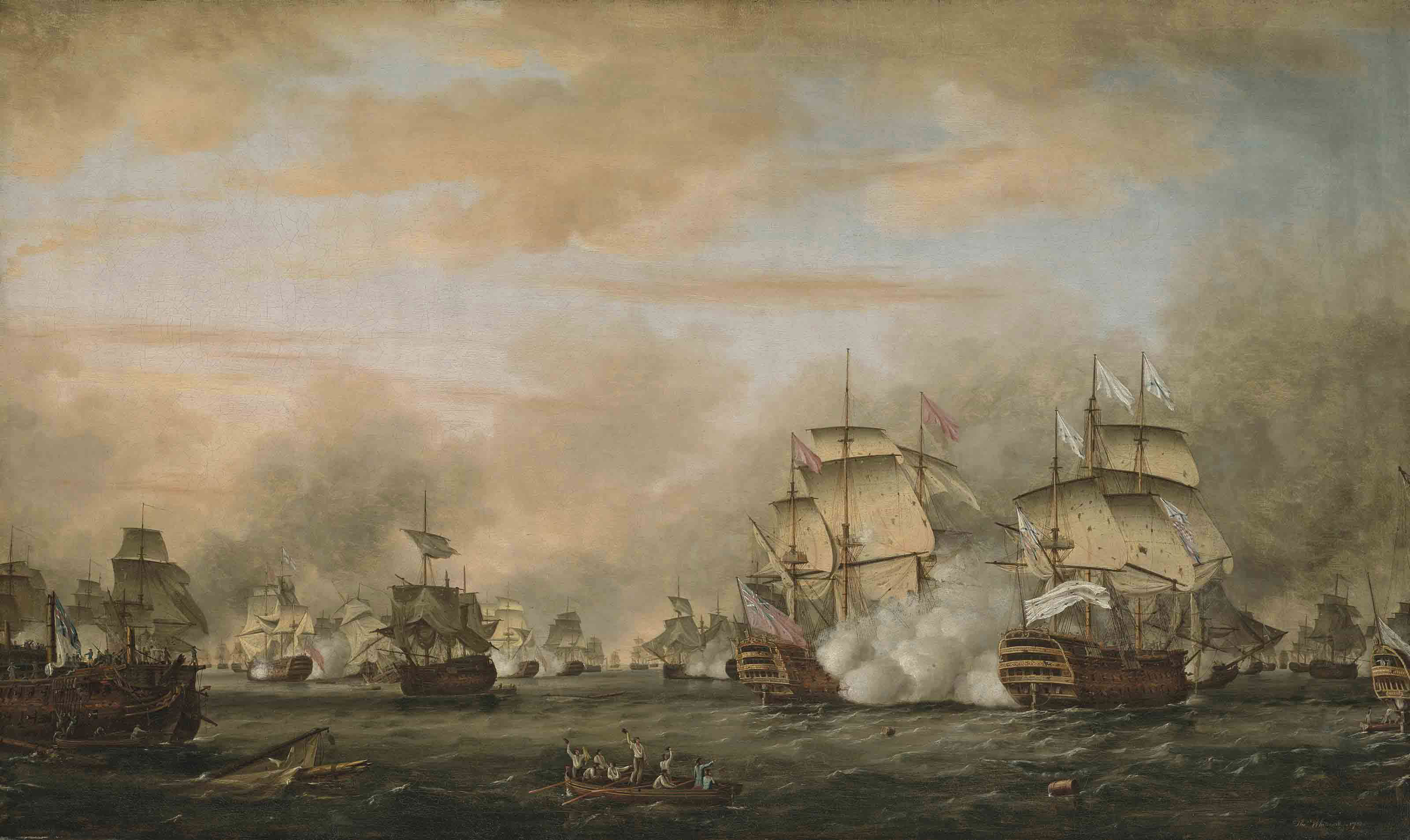
Rodney's success in breaking the French line brought on a decisive engagement at the Battle of the Saintes

At the Battle of the Saintes on 12 April 1782, Rodney was induced, by a change in the wind and the resulting disorder in the French line, to break his own line and pass through the enemy line. The effect was decisive. The guns of the British ships were concentrated on a handful of French ships as the British broke through the French line in three places, and the tactical cohesion of the French fleet was destroyed. By the end of the battle, Rodney had taken the French flagship and four other ships. The successful result of this departure from the old practice of keeping the line intact throughout the battle ruined the moral authority of the orthodox system of tactics.

=== Sir John Clerk of Eldin ===
The inconclusive results of so many battles at sea interested Sir John Clerk of Eldin (1728–1812), a gentleman of the Scottish Enlightenment, illustrator of geologist James Hutton's Theory of the Earth, and great-uncle of James Clerk Maxwell. He began developing a series of speculations and calculations which he initially published in pamphlets, distributing them among naval officers, and published in book form as An Essay on Naval Tactics in 1790, 1797 and 1804.

The hypothesis which governed all of Clerk's demonstrations was that as the British navy was superior in gunnery and seamanship to their enemy, it was in their interest to produce a mêlée. He advanced various ingenious suggestions for concentrating superior forces on parts of the enemy's line – by preference on the rear, since the centre must lose time in turning to its support.

== Technical innovations in the late 18th century ==
By the outbreak of the French Revolutionary Wars in 1793, a series of technical innovations first introduced during the American War of Independence had combined to give the British fleet a distinct superiority over the ships of the French and Spanish navies. These innovations were:

- The carronade: the carronade was a short-barrelled gun which threw a heavy ball developed by the Carron Company, a Scottish ironworks, in 1778. Because of irregularities in the size of cannonballs and the difficulty of boring out gun barrels, there was usually a considerable gap between the ball and the bore – often as much as a quarter of an inch – with a consequent loss of efficiency. This gap was known as the "windage". The manufacturing practices introduced by the Carron Company reduced the windage considerably, enabling the ball to be fired with less powder and hence a smaller and lighter gun. The carronade was half the weight of an equivalent long gun, but could throw a heavy ball over a limited distance. The light weight of the carronade meant that the guns could be added to the forecastle and quarterdeck of frigates and ships of the line, increasing firepower without affecting the ship's sailing qualities. It became known as the "smasher" and gave ships armed with carronades a great advantage at short range.
- The flintlock: flintlock firing mechanisms for cannon were suggested by Captain Sir Charles Douglas and introduced during the American War of Independence in place of the traditional matches. Flintlocks enabled a higher rate of fire and greater accuracy as the gun captain could choose the exact moment of firing. Prior to this the Royal Navy introduced the use of goose quills filled with powder during the Seven Years' War giving an almost instantaneous burn time compared with earlier methods of detonation.
- A wider field of fire: by the simple expedient of attaching the gun ropes at a greater distance from the gunports, Douglas increased the range through which each cannon could be traversed, increasing the ship's field of fire. The new system was first tested at the Battle of the Saintes, in 1782, where the Duke, Formidable and Arrogant, and perhaps other British ships, had adopted Douglas's new system.
- Copper sheathing: after many trials, copper was found to be a practicable means of protecting the hulls of ships from marine growth and fouling. Copper sheathing delayed the growth of weeds on the hull, improving the sailing performance of ships that had been long out of dock. This had significant strategic as well as tactical implications. Up to 1780, the British, who kept their ships at sea for longer periods, had almost always found that the clean French ships were faster and could therefore avoid battle if they wished. The introduction of copper sheathing meant that ships that had spent months on blockade were not necessarily at an immediate speed disadvantage to enemy ships coming freshly out of port.

== Developments during the French Revolutionary and Napoleonic Wars ==
By the outbreak of the French Revolutionary Wars in 1793, technical innovations and the disorganization of the French navy wrought by the revolution, had combined to give British ships a distinct superiority over the ships of the French and Spanish navies. Britain had a far larger ocean trade than any of her main enemies, and a much bigger reserve of professional seamen from which to man warships. Throughout the 18th century the French and, particularly, the Spanish navy suffered from serious manning difficulties and were often forced to complete the ships' crews with soldiers or landsmen.

British ships not only had a higher proportion of seamen, but the long months at sea on blockade or convoy escort gave British captains plenty of opportunities to train their crews. British gun crews achieved a higher rate of fire than French or Spanish gun crews, contributing to the much higher casualties suffered by ships from those fleets. The better seamanship, faster gunnery and higher morale of British crews was a decisive advantage.

The leading British admirals like Howe devoted their efforts to how to break the enemy's line in order to bring on the kind of pell mell battle that would bring decisive results. At the Battle of the First of June in 1794, Lord Howe ordered his fleet to steer through the enemy, and then engage the French ships from the leeward, so as to cut off their usual retreat. This had the effect of bringing his fleet into a melee in which the individual superiority of his ships would have free play.

Nelson's unorthodox head-on attack at the Battle of Trafalgar produced a mêlée that destroyed the Franco-Spanish fleet

Throughout the wars, which lasted, with a brief interval of peace, from 1793 to 1815, British admirals like Jervis, Duncan and particularly Nelson grew bolder in the method they adopted for producing the desired mêlée or pell-mell action at the battles of Cape St. Vincent, Camperdown and Trafalgar. The most radical tactic was the head-on approach in column used by Nelson at Trafalgar, which invited a raking fire to which his own ships could not reply as they approached, but then produced a devastating raking fire as the British ships passed through the Franco-Spanish line.

It has been argued both that the tactics of these British admirals were too risky, and would have proved disastrous if tried against more skillful opponents; and also that this was an acceptable risk given the lack of a better alternative. That the tactics of British admirals during the wars of 1793–1815 had themselves no such advantage was demonstrated at the Battle of Lissa in 1811. The tactics were justified because the reliance of admirals on the quality of their fleets was well based. A vessel, while bearing down on an enemy's line, could not be exposed to the fire of three enemies at once, when at a distance less than 950 yards, because the guns could not be trained to converge on a nearer point. The whole range of effective fire was only a thousand yards or a little over. The chance that a ship would be dismasted and stopped before reaching the enemy's line was small.

== Fighting at anchor ==
Towards the end of the period of sailing navies, a number of fights took place between defending fleets or squadrons anchored close to the shore or in harbours, and attacking fleets forced to sail to within range while under fire.

Such battles tended to be decisive, as a wind which was fair to allow the attackers to enter a harbour or anchorage would let neither side out again. As it would normally be more profitable for the attackers to blockade the enemy until they were forced to sortie to accept battle in open water, such attacks were usually forced by lack of time, e.g. by shortage of supplies, the threatened onset of bad weather or the need to coordinate operations with an army on land.

The defenders could expect to enjoy several advantages. As they would not need to manoeuvre under sail, most of the ships' crews could man the guns. If properly prepared, the ships would have "springs"; extra cables bound to the anchor cables, which they could haul in or let out to veer the ship to bring its guns to bear over a wide arc. If close to a naval establishment (such as at the Battle of Copenhagen), they could rely on boats from the shore to bring extra ammunition or replacements for casualties and if in range the defending ships could be aided by coastal gun batteries. The worst British naval reverse of the Napoleonic Wars occurred during an attack on a protected anchorage at the Battle of Grand Port.

== Rules and incentives ==
In a paper in Explorations in Economic History, Douglas Allen argues the long period of British success fighting under sail depended on organizational rules surrounding officers and paying officers through prizes, which were designed to encourage officers to be at sea, to drill their crews to fight, and to engage the enemy. As a consequence, the Royal Navy did not depend on superior technology, geography, or luck. The rules were discarded with the introduction of steam which allowed for direct monitoring of captains and admirals. In contrast, Allen argues the French incentives did not encourage fighting and led to a Navy better trained in sailing.

== See also ==
- Naval tactics
- Naval strategy
- Ship of the line
- Naval artillery in the Age of Sail
- Naval operations in the American Revolutionary War
- Naval tactics in the Age of Steam
