= Naval tactics in the Age of Steam =

Aspect of naval history

The development of the steam ironclad firing explosive shells in the mid-19th century rendered sailing ship tactics obsolete.

New tactics were developed for the big-gun Dreadnought battleships. The mine, torpedo, submarine and aircraft posed new threats, each of which had to be countered, leading to tactical developments such as anti-submarine warfare and the use of dazzle camouflage. By the end of the steam age, aircraft carriers had replaced battleships as the principal unit of the fleet.

== Beginnings in the 19th century ==
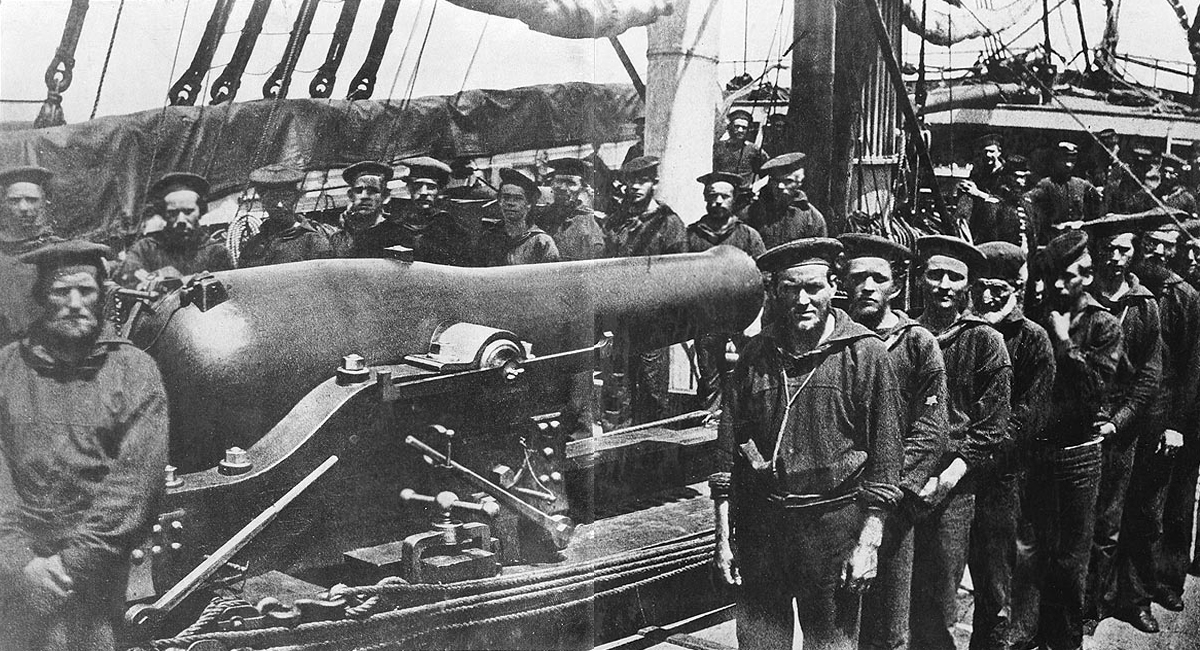
Crewmembers of USS Wissahickon by the ship's 11-inch (280 mm) Dahlgren gun, circa 1863

The interval of 89 years between the end of the Napoleonic Wars in 1815 and the beginning of the Russo-Japanese War in 1904 was marked by no major naval war. There was fighting at sea, and there were prolonged blockades, but there were no campaigns between large and well-appointed navies.

During this period an entire revolution took place in the means of propulsion, armament and construction of ships. Steam was applied to warships, at first to auxiliary forces, in the second quarter of the 19th century. The Crimean War gave a great stimulus to the development of the guns, and brought about the application of iron to ships as armour-plate. Very soon metal was adopted as the material of which ships were made. The extended use of shells, by immensely increasing the danger of fire, rendered wood so inflammable that it was too dangerous for employment in a warship. Changes so sweeping as these could not take place without affecting all the established ideas as to propulsion, armament and construction.

=== Revival of ramming ===
Steam allowed the ship herself to be used as a projectile. Many thought that the use of the ram would again become common and the sinking of Re d'Italia by the Austrian Erzherzog Ferdinand Max at the Battle of Lissa in 1866 seemed to give force to this supposition. Accidental collisions such as those between the British warships Vanguard and Iron Duke, Victoria and Camperdown showed how fatal a wound could be given by the ram of a steam warship. But even the sinking of Re d'Italia was largely an accident, and steam-powered ramming turned out to be impractical.

Between vessels both under full control, a collision was easily avoided where there was space to move. In a mêlée, or pell-mell battle (as at Lissa), opportunities would occur for the use of the ram, but the torpedo and the mine soon made it very dangerous for one fleet to rush at another. The torpedo may be said therefore to have excluded the pell-mell battle and the use of the ram except on rare occasions.

Ramming as a tactic also invalidated the former need to concentrate guns on the broadside, which in any case was being made obsolete by the larger guns developed as a consequence of the Industrial Revolution and made necessary by the iron or steel armour now being used. Fewer of the large guns could be carried or mounted, and a wider arc of fire was required to compensate.

Since ships would be required to fight "end-on" when attempting to ram (or to rush into a pell-mell battle), many ships were designed to give as much fire ahead (and sometimes astern) as on the broadside. This was usually at the expense of seaworthiness, and in many cases firing directly ahead caused blast damage to superstructure, decks and fittings. This was another factor which made ramming invalid as a tactic.

Furthermore, a ship designed to have a ramming capability typically had a tumblehome hull design which would allow the ram to strike below the waterline. This design of hull is inherently slower than almost any other hull design, giving an additional disadvantage to ships employing rams.

=== Development of the torpedo ===
As the 19th century drew to a close, another element of uncertainty was introduced by the development of the torpedo. A weapon which is a floating and moving mine, capable up to a certain point of being directed on its course, invisible or very hard to trace, and able to deliver its blow beneath the water-line, was so complete a novelty that its action was hard to foresee. The new weapon scored its first success in the 1891 Chilean Civil War, when the old Congressional battleship "Blanco Encalada" was sunk at anchor by the Balmacedist torpedo gunboat "Almirante Lynch" in the Battle of Caldera Bay.

The question arose whether the torpedo itself would not become the decisive weapon in naval warfare. It was undoubtedly capable of producing a great effect when its power could be fully exerted. A school arose, having its most convinced partisans in France, which argued that, as a small vessel could destroy a great battleship with a single torpedo, the first would drive the second off the sea. The battleship was to give place to the torpedo boat or torpedo-boat destroyer, which was itself only a torpedo boat of larger size.

But the early torpedo was subject to some disadvantages. It could not be used with effect at more than 2,000 yards. Water resistance rendered its course uncertain and comparatively slow, so that a moving opponent could avoid it, which was comparatively easy given that most early torpedoes left behind a tell-tale trail of bubbles in their wake. Torpedo boats were small and could easily be sunk by gunfire. By night the risk from gunfire was less, but the invention of the searchlight made it possible to keep the waters round a ship under observation all night.

From the torpedo sprang too the submarine, which aimed at striking below the surface, where it itself was, like its weapon, invisible, or nearly so.

== The Russo-Japanese War ==
The Russo-Japanese War was the first test of the new concepts. The war was a stunning victory for Japan, opening with the blockade and gradual immobilization of the Russian Pacific Fleet at Port Arthur and culminating in the destruction of the Russian Baltic Fleet at the Battle of Tsushima in 1905.

=== First use of torpedoes in battle ===
In the war between Russia and Japan the torpedo was at first used with success, but the injury it produced fell below expectations, even when allowance is made for the fact that the Russian squadron at Port Arthur had the means of repair close at hand. In the sea fights of the war it was of subordinate use, and indeed was not employed except to give the final stroke to, or force the surrender of, an already crippled ship.

=== Effectiveness of mines ===
The war also saw the first use of mines as an offensive, rather than purely defensive, weapon when the Japanese laid a minefield outside Port Arthur. On April 12, 1904, the Russian flagship Petropavlovsk ran into the minefield off Port Arthur and was sunk, while the battleship Pobieda was badly damaged. The Russians turned the same tactic on the Japanese who lost two of their six battleships, the Yashima and the Hatsuse, in a newly laid Russian minefield off Port Arthur a month later.

=== Sinking ships to block harbours ===
The Russo-Japanese War (and as much may be said for the war between the United States and Spain) confirmed an old experience. A resolute attempt was made by the Americans to block the entrance to Santiago de Cuba with a blockship. The Japanese renewed the attempt on a great scale and with utmost intrepidity, at Port Arthur; but though a steamship can move with a speed and precision impossible to a sailing ship, and can therefore be sunk more surely at a chosen spot, the experiment failed. Neither Americans nor Japanese succeeded in preventing their enemy from coming out when it wished.

== Development of Dreadnoughts ==
As the 19th century came to a close, the familiar modern battleship began to emerge; a steel-armoured ship, entirely dependent on steam and carrying a relatively small number of large guns mounted in turrets, typically arranged along the centreline of the main deck. The revolutionary Dreadnought of 1906 was the first battleship to almost entirely dispense with smaller guns and used steam turbines for her main propulsion. The Dreadnought rendered all existing battleships obsolete, because she was larger, faster, more powerfully armed and more strongly protected than existing battleships, which came to be known as pre-Dreadnoughts. This sudden levelling of the field led to a naval arms race as Britain and Germany and, to a lesser extent, other powers like the United States, France, Russia, Japan, Italy, Austria-Hungary, Turkey, Brazil, Argentina and Chile all rushed to build or acquire Dreadnoughts.

== The First World War ==
The introduction of mines, torpedoes and submarines greatly increased the complexity of naval tactics during the First World War. Even so, the gun remained the principal naval weapon. It could still deliver its blows at the greatest distance in the greatest variety of circumstances.

=== Fleet tactics ===
The development of long-range guns mounted in turrets changed the nature of naval tactics. While concentration remained a fundamental objective of tactics, the increased range and field of fire of naval guns meant that admirals now sought to achieve concentration of fire, rather than concentration of ships. The aim of a skilful officer was to concentrate a superior force on a part of his opponent's formation.

In the age of sail, when the range of effective fire was a thousand or twelve hundred yards and guns could only be trained over a small arc because they were fired out of ports, concentration could only be effected by bringing a larger number of ships into close action with a smaller. By the early 20th century, when gunfire was effective at 7,000 yards or more, and when guns fired from turrets and barbettes had a far wider sweep, concentration could be effected from a distance. The power to effect it had to be sought by a judicious choice of position.

The "line ahead" had been imposed on sailing fleets by the need to bring each ship's broadsides into action. Experiments made during manoeuvres by steam navies, combined with the experience gained in the war of 1904–05 in the Far East, showed that no material change had taken place in this respect. It was still as necessary as ever that all the guns should be so placed as to be capable of being brought to bear, and it was still a condition imposed by the physical necessities of the case that this freedom could only be obtained when ships followed one another in a line. This allowed each ship to fire over wide arcs without firing over friendly ships. Steaming with the enemy off to the side enabled a ship to fire salvoes with both the forward and rear turrets, maximizing the chances for a hit.

When in pursuit or flight, or when steaming on the look-out for a still unseen enemy, a fleet may be arranged in the "line abreast". A pursuing fleet would have to run the risk of being struck by torpedoes dropped by a retreating enemy. But it would have the advantage of being able to bring all its guns which can fire ahead to bear on the rear ship of the enemy. When an opponent was prepared to give battle, and turns his broadside so as to bring the maximum of his gunfire to bear, he must be answered by a similar display of force – in other words, the line ahead must be formed to meet the line ahead. Each ship in the line generally engaged its opposite number in the enemy battle line.

The layout of gun turrets on a deck affects their permissible sectors of fire. The most common configuration of warship with gun turrets on its longitudinal axis severely limits gunfire directly ahead (forward) or abaft (backward). This was reflected in the standard naval tactic of crossing the T.

=== Introduction of camouflage ===
Dazzle camouflage was intended to make it difficult to estimate a ship's speed and heading and thus prevent submarines from effectively firing torpedoes. This was accomplished by painting striking designs along the ship, with long, bold lines frequently cutting across the hull and thus rendering the bow of the ship indistinct, which in turn prevented submarines from determining the heading or speed of the ships. This innovation was short-lived, however, as the stark lines intended to confuse submarines only made ships into more visible targets for aircraft. The final evolution of camouflage was into the now prevalent gray shades which almost all warships since WWII have been painted. In the US Navy this is known as "Haze Gray".

=== Development of the submarine ===
Tactically, submarines of the First World War were similar to privateers in the Age of Sail, because they were employed primarily to destroy the enemy's merchant traffic in an extremely opportunistic sense rather than engage in battle with enemy naval vessels. Individually, submarines were only capable of sinking a small number of ships because of their limited supply of torpedoes and shells.

Anti-submarine tactics were in their infancy at the outbreak of the First World War. Surface warships lacked the means to detect submerged submarines or the weapons to attack them. Surface warships were reduced to hoping to sight the periscope of a submerged submarine or the wake of its torpedoes. Other than gunfire, the only way to sink a submarine was by ramming. Defensive anti-submarine tactics largely consisted of turning ships end-on to the submarine, to reduce the size of the target, by turning towards a submarine sighted off the bows and away from a submarine sighted off the stern.

By the end of 1914, German cruisers had largely been cleared from the oceans and the main threat to shipping came from U-boats. The British Admiralty was slow to respond to the change. Only in 1917, at the urging of the British Prime Minister, David Lloyd George, did the British institute a convoy system. Losses to U-boats dropped to a fraction of their former level.

=== Development of aircraft ===
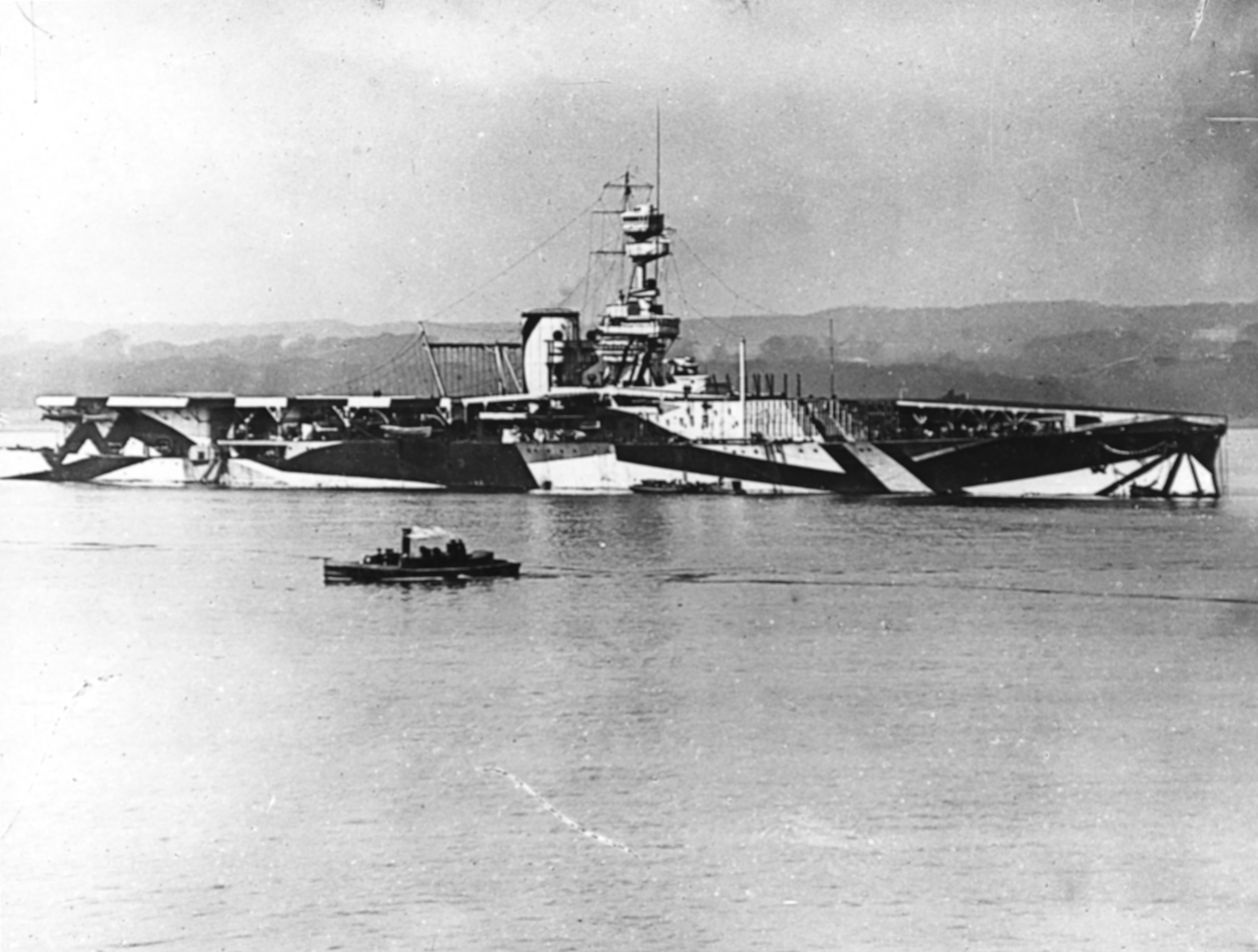
The British carrier Furious in 1918, after she had been fitted with a landing-on deck aft, but still clearly showing her cruiser origins. Note the large crash barrier rigged behind her funnel and her dazzle camouflage.

During the First World War, the German forces occasionally employed Zeppelins to attack enemy shipping, but this never inflicted serious losses.

Towards the end of the war, the British began to develop the first aircraft carriers by adding flying off and then landing decks to the large light cruiser Furious.

== The interwar years ==
Fearing another naval arms race, the big naval powers agreed to the Washington Naval Treaty and scrapped some of their battleships and cruisers while still on the slipways. In addition to this, the Washington Naval Treaty established limits on the total tonnage of the fleets of America, Japan and Britain. It was decided in negotiations that a ratio of power would be established of 5:5:3, corresponding to America, Britain and Japan in that order. This meant that the Japanese fleet would only be allowed a fraction of the power that was given to the American and British fleets, a fact which lead directly to the Japanese construction of super battleships. Although this treaty was extremely explicit in its governance of battleship and cruiser tonnage, it was lax in the area of carriers, a fact which all of the participants failed to take advantage of. The growing tensions of the 1930s and the rise of aggressive nationalist governments in Japan, Italy and Germany restarted the building programs, with even larger ships than before; Yamato, the largest battleship ever, displaced 72,000 tons, and mounted 18.1-inch guns.

=== Emergence of the aircraft carrier ===
Shortly after the end of the war, the first aircraft carriers designed from the keel up were completed: the Japanese Hōshō and the British Hermes. Both ships were too small to be satisfactory. Under the terms of the Washington Treaty, Britain, America and Japan were allowed to convert two ships that were due to scrap under the treaty into aircraft carriers. By luck as much as planning, the Americans and Japanese both developed large carriers that were capable of handling up to 90 aircraft, based on the hulls of battlecruisers due to be scrapped under the Washington Treaty. Both navies gradually began to develop new tactics for employing aircraft carriers in battle, although these tactics did not come into full fruition until the middle of the Pacific Campaign of WWII.

=== Development of new weapons ===
The Magnetic mine was a German development that allowed naval mines to become more deadly than ever; by detecting the magnetic charge of a large ship a mine could detonate without ever having to make contact with the craft, and it would be completely harmless to smaller ships, whose lack of a strong magnetic field allowed them to pass safely, saving the mine for more valuable targets. The oxygen Long lance torpedo, which used pure oxygen instead of air for the oxidizer, was developed by the Japanese just prior to their full involvement in WWII. Despite having more than twice the effective range of the best Allied torpedoes and lacking the tell-tale torpedo wake, the oxygen torpedo was not used to its fullest capacity by the Japanese Imperial Navy, mostly because of inefficient submarine deployment.

== The Second World War ==
During the Second World War, tactical developments became even more closely tied to the development of new weapons and technologies. The war saw the first large-scale tactical use of hydrophones, sonar (or ASDIC) and radar, and the development of new technologies such as high-frequency direction finding (HF/DF).

In the North Sea and Atlantic, Germany lacked the strength to challenge the Allies for command of the sea. Instead, German naval strategy relied on commerce raiding using capital ships, armed merchant cruisers, submarines and aircraft. The Allies immediately introduced a convoy system for the protection of trade that gradually extended out from the British Isles, eventually reaching as far as Panama, Bombay and Singapore. In the Mediterranean, Britain and Italy fought a conventional naval war for command of the sea.

The need to provide capital ships with the anti-submarine protection of a destroyer screen and air cover from an aircraft carrier led to the increasing use of ad hoc task forces, composed of whichever ships were available for a particular operation. Later in the war however, anti-submarine warfare was perfected to a large degree by the Allies, meaning that much more specialized ships and equipment were deployed in convoys with the express purpose of detecting and destroying German (and later Japanese) submarines.

=== Impact of aircraft on tactics ===
The development of air power led to further tactical changes, including the emergence of aircraft carriers and the development of naval air fleets. The employment of land-based and carrier-based aircraft during the Second World War showed that command of the seas rested in great part on control of the air above it.

Off Norway in the spring of 1940 and in the English Channel in the summer of that year, the German Luftwaffe demonstrated that the British could not maintain command of the sea in daytime without command of the air. In the following year, the arrival of Luftwaffe squadrons in the Mediterranean reversed the British ascendancy in the theatre by neutralizing the British dominance at sea.

=== Development of the wolf pack ===
With the immediate introduction of convoy by the Allies at the start of the Second World War, the German submarines (known as U-boats) operating against Allied trade in the Atlantic were driven to adopt new tactics.

Until the last year of the war, almost all U-boats were diesel-powered, relying on electric motors for propulsion while underwater. This design had important tactical implications. The electric motors were far less powerful than the diesel engines and had a short battery life. When submerged, most submarines were capable of about 10 knots, little more than the slowest merchantman. So a submerged submarine was not only much slower than when on the surface, but also unable to proceed at its maximum submerged speed for any length of time. Submarines of the Second World War were more submersibles than true submarines.

Under Admiral Karl Dönitz the U-boats further developed the tactics of surface night attacks that had first been used in the First World War and then refined in exercises in the Baltic before the Second World War. Rather than attacking in daylight while submerged, the German U-boat commanders developed a tactic for operating more like torpedo boats than submarines, attacking on the surface at night where they could use their higher surfaced speed. Approaching the convoys at night on the surface, they found that they could pass quite close to the escorts and yet remain undetected. Look outs high up on the bridges of the escort ships found it all but impossible to spot the low shape of the U-boat with the tiny silhouette of the boat's conning tower against the darkness of the water. But for the U-boats, the escorts and the merchantmen stood out starkly against the lightness of the sky.

The convoy battles of the First World War had taught the Germans that a single submarine had little prospect of success against a well defended convoy. Instead of attacking the Allied convoys singly, the German U-boats now began to work in packs co-ordinated centrally by radio. The boats spread out into a long patrol line that crossed the path of the Allied convoy routes. Once in position the boats used hydrophones to pick up the propeller noises of the convoys, or used binoculars to try to spot the tell-tale smoke of a convoy on the horizon. When one boat sighted a convoy, it followed it, broadcasting the convoy's position and waiting for other boats to come up before attacking. So instead of being faced by a single submarine, the convoy escorts had to cope with a group of U-boats attacking in a single night. The most daring commanders, like Otto Kretschmer, not only penetrated the convoy's screen but attacked from within the columns of merchantmen in the convoy. The escort vessels, which were too few in number and often lacking in endurance, had no answer to the lone submarine attacking on the surface at night as their ASDIC detection apparatus only worked against underwater targets.

Pack tactics were first used successfully in October 1940, to devastating effect in the battles of Convoys SC 7 and HX 79. Convoy SC 7, with a weak escort of two sloops and two corvettes, was overwhelmed, losing 59% of its ships. The battle for Convoy HX 79 was in many ways worse than SC 7. The loss of a quarter of the convoy without any loss to the U-boats despite a strong escort of two destroyers, four corvettes, three naval trawlers and a minesweeper demonstrated the utter inadequacy of the contemporary British anti-submarine tactics. The success of pack tactics against these two convoys encouraged Admiral Dönitz to adopt the wolf pack as his standard tactics.

The change in British tactics included the introduction of permanent escort groups to improve the co-ordination and effectiveness of ships and men in battle. Initially, the escort groups consisted of two or three destroyers and half a dozen corvettes. Since two or three of the group would usually be in dock repairing weather or battle damage, the groups typically sailed with about six ships.

The Germans also made use of long-range patrol aircraft to find convoys for the U-boat packs to attack, though this tactic rarely succeeded.

Towards the end of the war the Germans introduced homing-torpedoes that aimed for the noise made by a target's propellers. Although devastatingly effective at first, the Allied scientists soon developed countermeasures.

The American submarine campaign in the Pacific contains many parallels with the German submarine campaign in the Atlantic. Like the Germans, the Americans began the war with a flawed weapon – faulty torpedoes – that undermined morale and took more than a year to fix. American submariners developed the same preference for attacking on the surface at night and similar pack tactics, although American wolf packs rarely exceeded three boats. But in the Pacific, it was the submarines, not the escorts, that benefited from the introduction of new technologies like radar. By 1943 many US submarines were fitted with radar, which American submarines were routinely using to find convoys and track the positions of escorts at night.

=== Development of anti-submarine warfare ===
The primary anti-submarine weapon was the convoy escort, typically a destroyer, armed with sonar (or Asdic) and depth charges.

The capture of U-570 in July 1941 gave the British a much greater understanding of the capabilities of the German U-boats. In particular, the British were astonished by the maximum safe diving depth of the U-boats, which was far below the deepest setting on Allied depth charges.

In the Pacific, the Japanese Navy failed to get a grip on the problems of convoy defence and failed to evolve effective anti-submarine tactics. With fewer escorts and many small convoys, the average number of escorts for a Japanese convoy was inevitably small and many were easily outmanoeuvred by the attacking submarines.

=== Eclipse of the battleship ===
The sinking of the British Prince of Wales and Repulse off Malaya on 10 December 1941 by Japanese aircraft marked the beginning of the end of the era of the battleship.

By the end of the Pacific War, the tactical role of battleships and cruisers had been reduced to providing anti-aircraft fire to protect the vulnerable carriers and bombarding shore positions. The Japanese battleships Yamato and Musashi were both sunk by aircraft long before they could come within striking range of the American fleet.

=== Dominance of the aircraft carrier ===
The British attack on the Italian naval base at Taranto in November 1940, in which one Italian battleship was sunk and two others heavily damaged, first demonstrated the full potential of the aircraft carrier. But the successful attack on ships in harbour did not convince advocates of the battleship that their day was over.

It was the Japanese who really developed the tactical and strategic potential of aircraft carriers. Learning from their experiences in operations off the Chinese coast from 1937 onwards, the Japanese began to combine their carriers into permanent squadrons. While the British and Americans were still operating carriers on their own or sometimes in pairs, by 1941 the Japanese had organized a naval air fleet containing as many as six aircraft carriers.

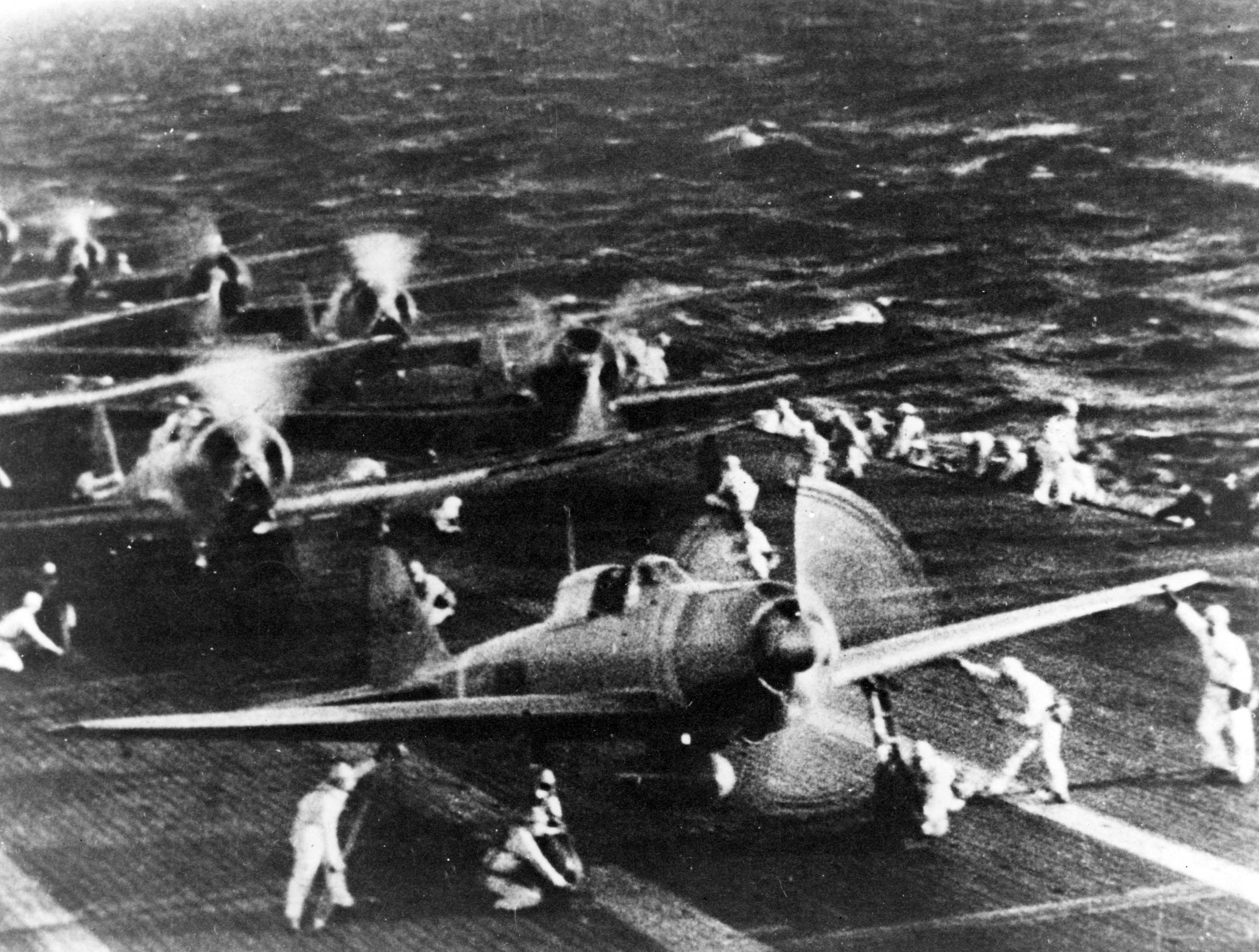
Planes from the Japanese aircraft carrier Shokaku preparing the attack on Pearl Harbor.

It was this force that struck the opening blow of the Pacific War at Pearl Harbor. The same carrier force then worked its way across the Pacific, attacking Allied forces at Rabaul, in the Netherlands East Indies, at Darwin and finally at Colombo and Trincomalee in Ceylon. The Allied forces in the East Indies were overwhelmed and the old battleships of the British Eastern Fleet forced to retreat as far as Kilindini on the African coast.

Despite these successes, many Japanese admirals still failed to grasp the tactical implications of the dominance of the aircraft carrier. Instead of using its battleships to escort the carriers, the Japanese Navy continued to husband its battleships for the decisive fleet action, which never came.

The Japanese success in sinking or damaging almost all the US Pacific Fleet's battleships at Pearl Harbor forced the Americans to base their tactics on the aircraft carrier (though they would possibly have developed such tactics anyway). The Americans quickly assembled a group of task forces, each based around a single carrier. Through a series of raids on Japanese-held islands, the American gradually grew more confident in their handling of aircraft carriers, learning that the right place for the task force commander was aboard a carrier, not one of the escorting cruisers, and developing tactics like having a single fighter direction officer for task forces operating in company. The four great carrier battles of 1942 – Coral Sea, Midway, Eastern Solomons and Santa Cruz – were all fought by aircraft without the ships on either side actually coming in sight of one another. The Japanese carriers were caught time and again by American aircraft with a light screen of cruisers and destroyers, contributing to the loss of six Japanese carriers in the four battles.

When the new American fast battleships began to arrive in the Pacific in the summer of 1942, they were allocated to the carrier task forces where their heavy anti-aircraft batteries could defend the vulnerable carriers, rather than being formed into separate battle squadrons. By 1943, as growing numbers of new carriers, battleships, cruisers and destroyers began to reach the Pacific, the Americans developed a fleet of fast carrier task forces that swept across the Pacific over the next two years, isolating, overwhelming and then destroying the Japanese island bases.

== Sources and references ==
- Bacon, Admiral Sir Reginald. The Jutland Scandal (London 1925). OCLC 1900062
- Conway's History of the Ship. Steam, Steel and Shellfire: The steam warship 1815–1905. ISBN 0-7858-1413-2
- Evans, David C & Peattie, Mark R. Kaigun: strategy, tactics, and technology in the Imperial Japanese Navy, 1887 & 1941 (Annapolis: Naval Institute Press 1997) ISBN 0-87021-192-7
- Macintyre, Donald. The Battle of the Atlantic (London 1961). OCLC 1214473
- Rohwer, Dr. Jürgen. The Critical Convoy Battles of March 1943 (London: Ian Allan 1977). ISBN 0-7110-0749-7

Specific
