= Squadron (naval) =

Military unit used by naval forces, usually comprising a number of ships

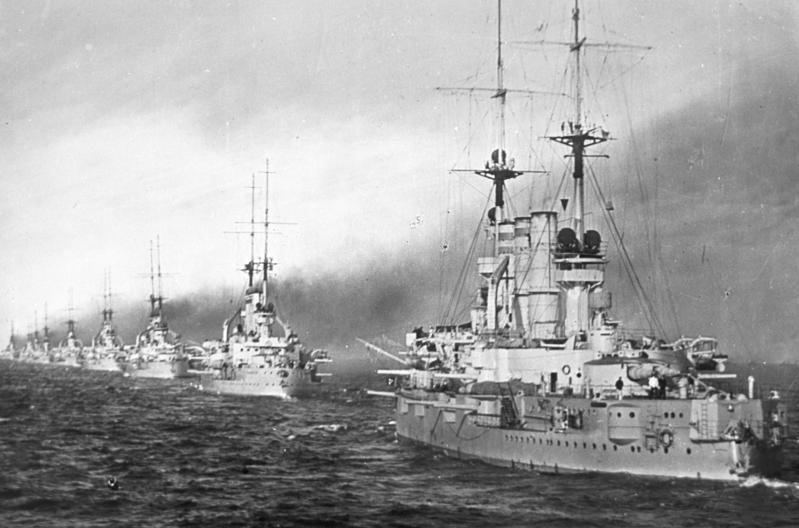
A squadron led by five battleships of the Deutschland class in line astern formation

A squadron, or naval squadron, is a significant group of warships which is nonetheless considered too small to be designated a fleet. A squadron is typically a part of a fleet. Between different navies there are no clear defining parameters to distinguish a squadron from a fleet (or from a flotilla), and the size and strength of a naval squadron varies greatly according to the country and time period. Groups of small warships, or small groups of major warships, might instead be designated flotillas by some navies according to their terminology. Since the size of a naval squadron varies greatly, the rank associated with command of a squadron also varies greatly.

Before 1864 the entire fleet of the Royal Navy was divided into three squadrons, the red, the white, and the blue. Each Royal Navy squadron alone was more powerful than most national navies. Today, a squadron might number three to ten vessels, which might be major warships, transport ships, submarines, or small craft in a larger task force or a fleet. A squadron may be composed of one type of ship of various types tasked with a specific mission such as coastal defense, blockade, or minesweeping. In the United States Navy, the term squadron has always been used for formations of destroyers and submarines.

== Command element ==
A fleet is usually commanded by a flag officer such as a vice admiral or a rear admiral, but squadrons are sometimes commanded by commodores or simply the most senior captain (often one and the same), depending on the importance of the command. A large squadron will sometimes be divided into two or more divisions, each of which might be commanded by a subordinate captain. Like a fleet, a squadron is usually, but not necessarily, a permanent formation.

== Squadron types ==
There are several types of squadron:

- Independent squadrons. In effect, these are formations that are too small to be called a fleet. Independent squadrons may be assigned to and named after a particular ocean or sea, and the admiral commanding the squadron may be the naval commander in chief in that theatre. An example of this type unit was the US Navy's Asiatic Squadron stationed in China between 1868 and 1902
- Temporary sub-divisions of a fleet. In the Age of Sail, fleets were divided into van, centre, and rear squadrons, named after each's place in the line of battle. A temporary detachment from a fleet would also be called a squadron.

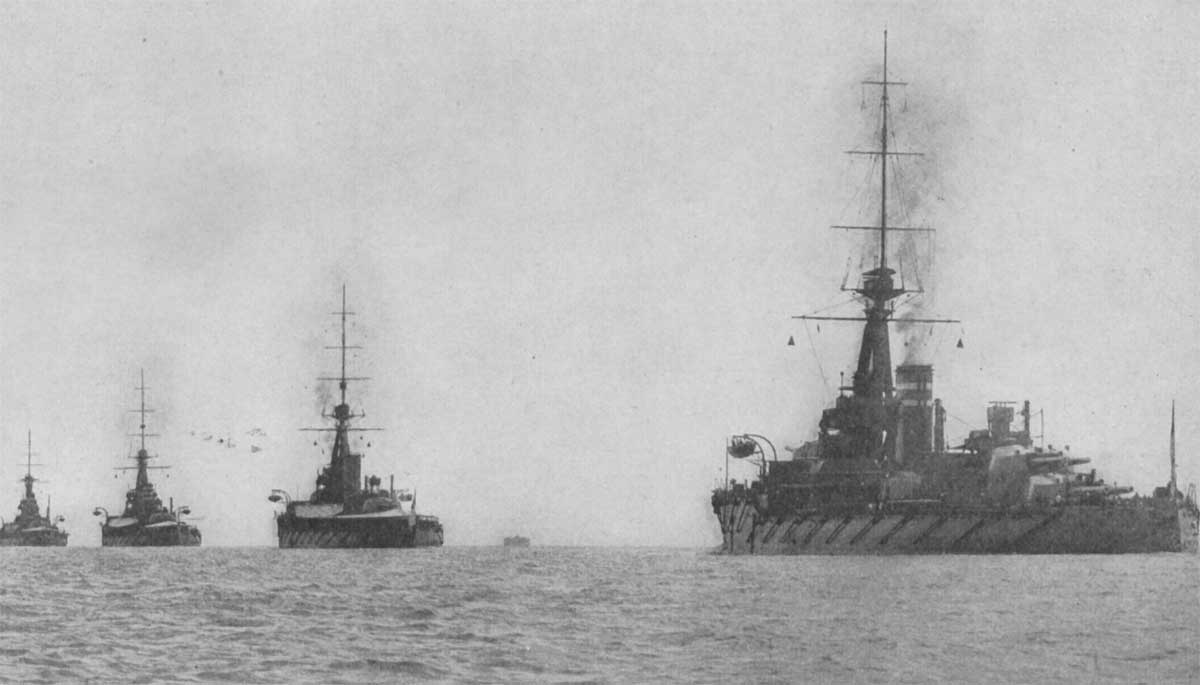
The 2nd Battle Squadron of the Royal Navy's Grand Fleet during the First World War. From left to right: King George V, Thunderer, Monarch, and Conqueror.

- Permanent battle formations. As warships evolved during the 19th century, larger warships began to be formed into and trained as permanent, numbered squadrons of the same class of warship such as the 5th Battle Squadron of the Royal Navy's Grand Fleet. U.S. Navy squadron types have included Battleship Squadrons, Cruiser Squadrons (CruRons), Destroyer Squadrons (DesRons), Escort Squadrons, Transport Squadrons (TransRons), and Submarine Squadrons (SubRons).

In modern navies, squadrons have tended to become administrative units. Most navies began to abandon the squadron as a tactical formation during the Second World War. The need to provide capital ships with the anti-submarine protection of a destroyer screen and air cover from an aircraft carrier led to the increasing use of the carrier battle group, or ad hoc task forces, composed of whichever ships were available for a particular operation.

As warships have grown larger, the term squadron has gradually replaced the term flotilla for formations of destroyers, frigates and submarines in many navies.

== See also ==
- Division (naval)
