= Raking fire =

Weapons fire directed parallel to the long axis of an enemy ship

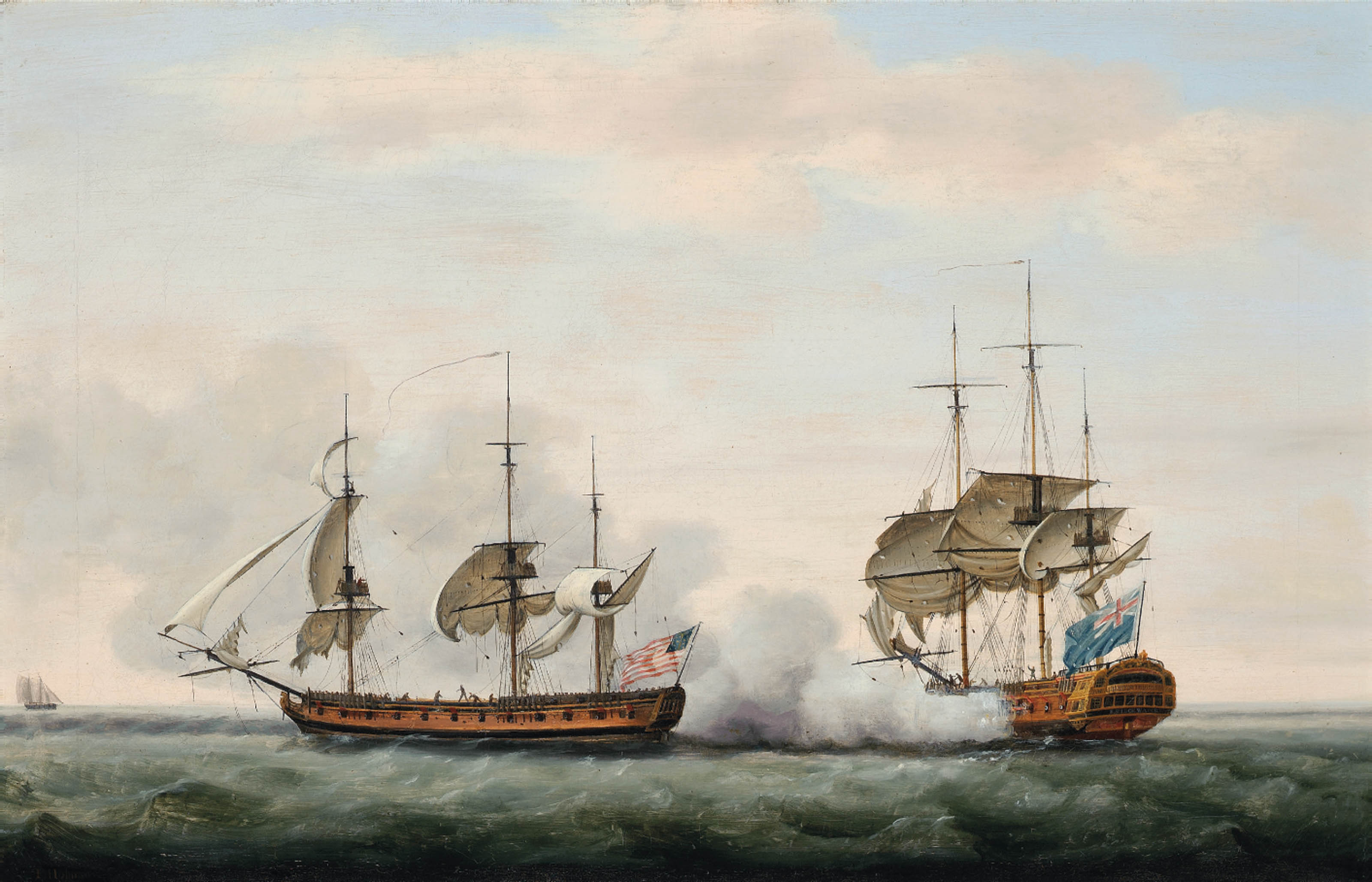
Painting of the British East Indiaman Bridgewater (right) raking the American privateer Hampden (left)

In naval warfare during the Age of Sail, raking fire was cannon fire directed parallel to the long axis of an enemy ship from ahead (in front of the ship) or astern (behind the ship). Although each shot was directed against a smaller profile compared to firing at the target ship's broadside and thus more likely to miss the target ship to one side or the other, an individual cannon shot that hit would pass through more of the ship, thereby increasing damage to the hull, sails, cannon and crew. In addition, the targeted ship would have fewer (if any) guns able to return fire.

Historically, a stern rake tended to be more damaging than a bow rake because the shots were less likely to be deflected by the curved and strengthened bow, and because disabling the exposed rudder at the stern would render the target unable to steer and thus manoeuvre. However, achieving a position to rake a single enemy ship was usually very difficult unless the opponent was unable to manoeuvre due to damage to its sails or rudder; it was easier if the enemy ship was required to maintain its position in a line of battle.

The effectiveness of this tactic was demonstrated at the Battle of Trafalgar. Admiral Nelson's HMS Victory, leading the weather column of the British fleet, broke the French line just astern of the French flagship Bucentaure, and just ahead of Redoutable. Victory raked the Bucentaure's less-protected stern, killing 197 and wounding a further 85, including the Bucentaure's captain, Jean-Jacques Magendie. Admiral Pierre-Charles Villeneuve survived, and although he was not captured for three hours, the raking put Bucentaure out of the fight. In the Royal Navy's Glorious First of June (1 June 1794) battle, Admiral Richard Howe ordered his British fleet to turn through the French line and rake the opposing ships. While only a small proportion of captains and ships achieved this, it was decisive enough to turn the battle.

== See also ==
- Sailing ship tactics
- Crossing the T
- Enfilade and defilade
