= Naval strategy =

Planning and conduct of war at sea

Naval strategy is the planning and conduct of war at sea, the naval equivalent of military strategy on land.

Naval strategy, and the related concept of maritime strategy, concerns the overall strategy for achieving victory at sea, including the planning and conduct of campaigns, the movement and disposition of naval forces by which a commander secures the advantage of fighting at a place convenient to themselves, and the deception of the enemy. Naval tactics deal with the execution of plans and manoeuvring of ships or fleets in battle.

== Principles ==
The great aims of a fleet in war must be to keep the coast of its own country free from attack, to secure the freedom of its trade, and to destroy the enemy's fleet or confine it to port. The first and second of these aims can be attained by the successful achievement of the third – the destruction or paralysis of the hostile fleet. A fleet that secures the freedom of its own communications from attack is said to have command of the sea.

Naval strategy is fundamentally different from land-based military strategy. At sea there is no territory to occupy. Apart from the fisheries and, more recently, offshore oilfields, there are no economic assets that can be denied to the enemy and no resources that a fleet can exploit. While an army can live off the land, a fleet must rely on whatever supplies it carries with it or can be brought to it.

== Origins ==
=== Torrington and the fleet in being ===
The British Admiral the Earl of Torrington allegedly originated the expression fleet in being. Faced with a clearly superior French fleet in the summer of 1690 during the War of the Grand Alliance, Torrington proposed avoiding battle, except under very favourable conditions, until the arrival of reinforcements. By maintaining his fleet in being, he would prevent the French from gaining command of the sea, which would allow them to invade England. However, Torrington was forced to fight at the Battle of Beachy Head (June 1690), a French victory which gave Paris control of the English Channel for only a few weeks.

=== Introduction of the guerre de course ===
By the mid-1690s, privateers from French Atlantic ports, particularly St. Malo and Dunkirk, were a major threat to Anglo-Dutch commerce. The threat forced the English government to divert warships to the defence of trade, as convoy escorts and cruisers to hunt down the privateers. In France, the success of privateers against the Anglo-Dutch war effort stimulated a gradual shift from the employment of the Royal warships as battlefleets (guerre d’escadre) towards supporting the war on trade (guerre de course). The allied convoys presented large targets for commerce raiding squadrons. The most dramatic result of this shift was the Comte de Tourville’s attack upon the allies’ Smyrna convoy on 17 June 1693.

The disadvantage of the guerre de course when pursued as a battlefleet strategy, rather than just by smaller vessels, is that it leaves a country's own trade defenceless. Individual raiding squadrons are also vulnerable to defeat in detail if the enemy sends larger squadrons in pursuit, as happened to Leissegues at the Battle of San Domingo in 1806 and Von Spee at the Battle of the Falkland Islands in 1914.

=== Hawke, St Vincent and the close blockade ===
Until after the end of the 17th century it was thought impossible, or at least very rash, to keep the great ships out of port between September and May or June. Therefore, continuous watch on an enemy by blockading his ports was beyond the power of any navy. Therefore, too, as an enemy fleet might be at sea before it could be stopped, the movements of fleets were much subordinated to the need for providing convoy to the trade.

It was not until the middle of the 18th century that the continuous blockade first carried out by Sir Edward Hawke in 1758–59, and then brought to perfection by Earl St Vincent and other British admirals between 1793 and 1815, became possible.

== Development ==
It was only at the very end of the 19th century that theories of naval strategy were first codified, even though British statesmen and admirals had been practising it for centuries.

=== Mahan's influence ===
Captain, later rear admiral, Alfred Thayer Mahan (1840–1914) was an American naval officer and historian.

Influenced by Jomini's principles of strategy, he argued that in the coming wars, control of the sea would grant the power to control the trade and resources needed to wage war. Mahan's premise was that in the contests between France and Britain in the 18th century, domination of the sea through naval power was the deciding factor in the outcome, and therefore, that control of seaborne commerce was secondary to domination in war. In Mahan's view, a country obtained "command of the sea" by concentrating its naval forces at the decisive point to destroy or master the enemy's battle fleet; blockade of enemy ports and disruption of the enemy's maritime communications would follow. Mahan believed that the true objective in a naval war was always the enemy fleet.

Mahan's writings were highly influential. His best-known books, The Influence of Sea Power upon History, 1660–1783, and The Influence of Sea Power upon the French Revolution and Empire, 1793–1812, were published in 1890 and 1892 respectively and his theories contributed to the naval arms race between 1898 and 1914.

Theodore Roosevelt, himself an accomplished historian of the naval history of the War of 1812, closely followed Mahan's ideas. He incorporated them into American naval strategy when he served as assistant secretary of the Navy in 1897–1898. As president, 1901–1909, Roosevelt made building up a world-class fighting fleet of high priority, sending his "Great White Fleet" around the globe in 1908–1909 to make sure all the naval powers understood the United States was now a major player. Building the Panama Canal was designed not just to open Pacific trade to East Coast cities, but also to enable the new Navy to move back and forth across the globe.

=== The Colomb brothers ===
In Britain, Captain John H. Colomb (1838–1909) in a series of articles and lectures argued that the navy was the most important component of imperial defence; his brother, Admiral Phillip Colomb (1831–1899), sought to establish from history general rules applicable to modern naval warfare in his Naval Warfare (1891). But their writings achieved nothing like the fame achieved by Mahan.

=== Corbett’s principles ===
Sir Julian Corbett (1854–1922) was a British naval historian who became a lecturer at the Royal Naval War College in Great Britain.

Corbett differed from Mahan in placing much less emphasis on fleet battle. Corbett emphasized the interdependence of naval and land warfare and tended to concentrate on the importance of sea communications rather than battle. Battle at sea was not an end in itself; the primary objective of the fleet was to secure one's own communications and disrupt those of the enemy, not necessarily to seek out and destroy the enemy's fleet. To Corbett, command of the sea was a relative and not an absolute which could be categorized as general or local, temporary or permanent. Corbett defined the two fundamental methods of obtaining control of the lines of communication as the actual physical destruction or capture of enemy warships and merchants, and or a naval blockade.

His most famous work, Some Principles of Maritime Strategy, remains a classic.

== Impact of the World Wars ==
World War I and II left a major impact on naval strategies thanks to new technologies. With the creation of new naval vessels like the submarine, strategies like unrestricted warfare were able to be implemented and with the creation of oil based fuel, radar and radio navies were able to act more efficiently and effectively since they were able to move faster, know where enemies were located and were able to communicate with ease.

=== Change of fuel from coal to oil ===
Before the start of the World War I, many naval warships ran on coal and manpower. This was very inefficient but the only way they could power these ships at the time. Half the crew on these ships were there to maintain the coal, but oil was seen more efficient to where the number of men needed to maintain it were nowhere near as many. With the newfound use of oil, the benefits were abundant for the warships. With the use of oil, ships were able to travel at 17 knots. This was drastically different compared to the 7 knots ships traveled before with the use of coal. Coal also took up more space in the ships. Oil can be stored in multiple tanks where they all circumvent to one place to be used unlike coal which was stored in the ship, in multiple rooms and had multiple boiler rooms.

=== World War I ===
Leading up to World War I, there was a naval arms race in Europe. With this race introducing many innovations to navies across Europe, in 1906 the British unveiled a revolutionary new warship called HMS Dreadnought powered by steam turbine. This ship reached a speed of 21 knots, one of the fastest at the time; this warship also had advancements in weaponry that no other nation's navy had at the time. With this, the arms race changed to which nation could build the most of those newly made warships. With these new, heavily armed ships the Allies had more opportunities for blockades in the various theaters of the war.

==== Warfare ====
The submarine, introduced in World War I, led to the development of new weapons and tactics. The Germans' fleet at the time was, in some people's opinion, the most advanced, and was constructed by Alfred von Tirpitz. The fleet consisted of the U-boat, and smaller class UB and UC boats.

==== Unrestricted warfare in WW1 ====
Unrestricted Warfare was first introduced during World War I by the German navy. This strategy sought to sink vessels, particularly commercial shipping, without warning. This proved decisive in America's entry into the war through the famous sinking of the RMS Lusitania. The strategy provoked international controversy due to the risk posed to the commerce and citizenry of neutral states. Before its entry into the war, the United States lobbied Germany to curtail the use of unrestricted submarine warfare. While this caused Germany to reduce such operations for a time, the strategy was ultimately resumed in an attempt to impede food and munitions supplies to Britain. The resumption of this strategy led many countries to try to ban the subsequent use of unrestricted submarine warfare, though this met with failure by the outbreak of WWII.

==== Technological impact in WW1 ====
===== Radio =====
Radio saw its first use in naval combat during the First World War. Early radio technology was not adopted universally at this point, as Morse code often proved more reliable than inconsistent or unclear radio signals. These two technologies were jointly used to communicate between ships, bases, and naval command. Improved radio technology greatly advanced naval intelligence and coordination by increasing communication speed, efficiency, and range.

=== World War 2 ===
==== Submarine warfare ====
===== Unrestricted warfare in WW2 =====
World War II saw broad use of unrestricted submarine warfare. This was especially notable in the Battle of the Atlantic, as Axis powers sought to restrict British and French contact with their colonial possessions and limit their involvement in the Pacific theater. After American entry in 1941, US forces targeted Axis commercial and military fleets across the Atlantic basin and in the Pacific War.

==== Technological impact in WW2 ====
===== Radar =====
Approaching World War II, militaries gained new technological and strategic capabilities through the use of radar. Radar is used by navies to detect planes and ships that enter the nation's coastal zone and to detect objects that pass by vessels at sea. Navies could thus use radar to clearly detect where enemy ships were located before attacking, as well as knowing when enemies were approaching to attack their vessels in turn.

===== Radio =====
Radio continued to play a vital role in naval communication during the Second World War as it did in the First, the major difference being its widespread adoption by all combatants. Additionally, militaries used radio to communicate with the general public.

== Modern ==
Increasingly naval strategy has been merged with general strategy involving land and air warfare.

Naval strategy constantly evolves as improved technologies become available. During the Cold War, for example, the Soviet Navy shifted from a strategy of directly contending against NATO for control of the bluewater oceans to a concentrated defense of the Barents Sea and the Sea of Okhotsk bastions.

In 2007, the U.S. Navy joined with the U.S. Marine Corps and U.S. Coast Guard to adopt a new maritime strategy called A Cooperative Strategy for 21st Century Seapower that raised the notion of prevention of war to the same philosophical level as the conduct of war. The strategy was presented by the Chief of Naval Operations, the Commandant of the Marine Corps and Commandant of the Coast Guard at the International Seapower Symposium in Newport, R.I. The strategy recognized the economic links of the global system and how any disruption due to regional crises – man-made or natural – can adversely impact the U.S. economy and quality of life. This new strategy charted a course for the three U.S. sea services to work collectively with each other and international partners to prevent these crises from occurring or reacting quickly should one occur to avoid negative impacts to the United States. Sometimes a military force is used as a preventative measure to avoid war, not cause it.

== See also ==
- Command of the sea
- Military strategy
- Strategy
- Grand strategy
- Operational mobility
- Military doctrine
- Principles of war
- Military tactics
- Naval tactics
