= Naval tactics =

Methods of engaging and defeating an enemy ship or fleet during naval warfare

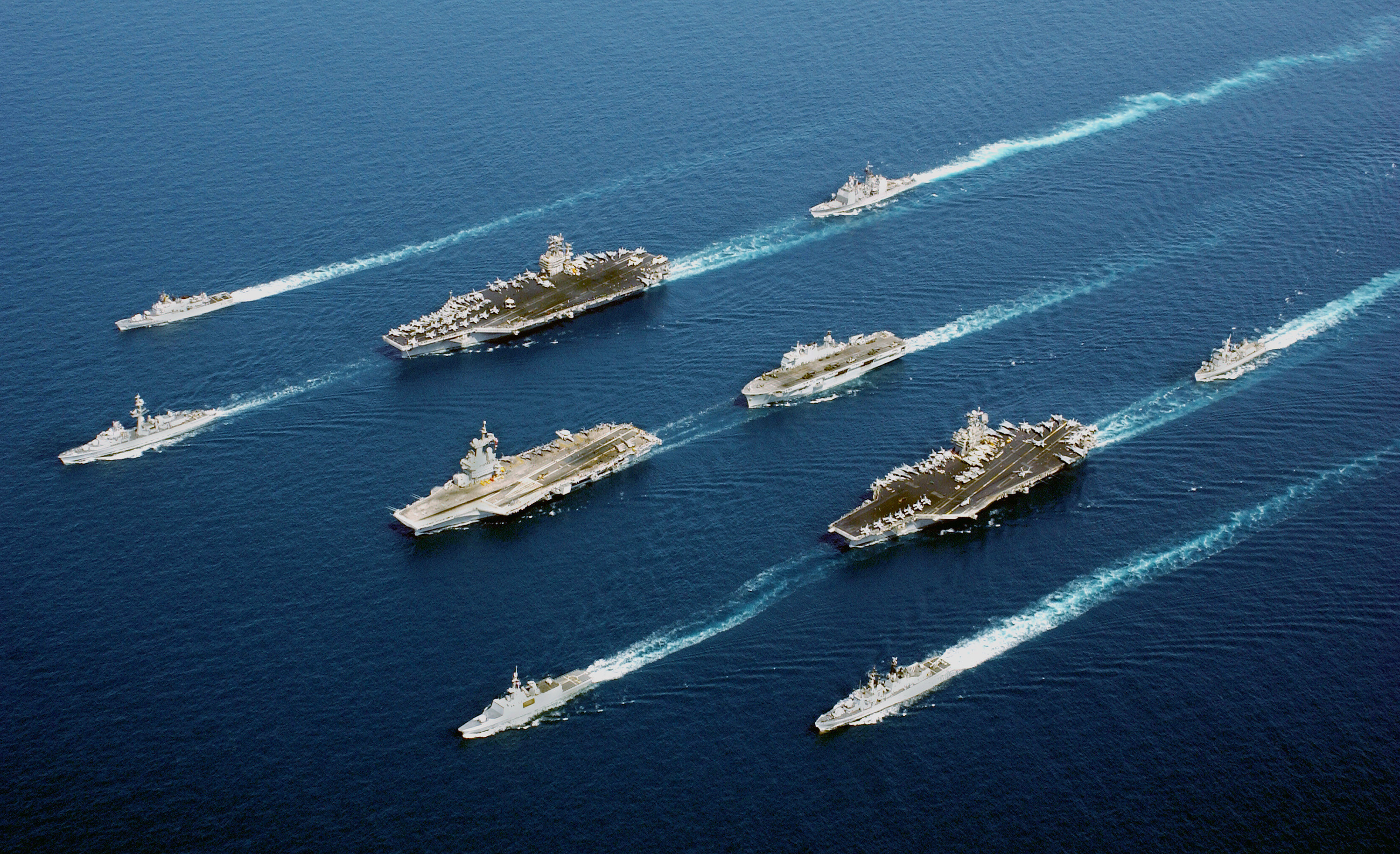
A five-country multinational fleet, during Operation Enduring Freedom in the Oman Sea. In four descending columns, from the top left to the bottom right: Maestrale, De Grasse; USS John C. Stennis, Charles de Gaulle, Surcouf; USS Port Royal, HMS Ocean, USS John F. Kennedy, HNLMS Van Amstel ; and Luigi Durand de la Penne

Naval tactics and doctrine is the collective name for methods of engaging and defeating an enemy ship or fleet in battle at sea during naval warfare, the naval equivalent of military tactics on land.

Naval tactics are distinct from naval strategy. Naval tactics are concerned with the movements a commander makes in battle, typically in the presence of the enemy. Naval strategy concerns the overall strategy for achieving victory and the large movements by which a commandant or commander secures the advantage of fighting at a place convenient to himself.

Modern naval tactics are based on tactical doctrines developed after World War II, following the obsolescence of the battleship and the development of long-range missiles. Since there has been no major naval conflict since World War II, apart from the Indo-Pakistani Naval War of 1971 and the Falklands War, many of these doctrines reflect scenarios developed for planning purposes. Critics argue that the collapse of the Soviet Union and the subsequent reduction in the size and capabilities of the Russian Navy renders most such fleet-on-fleet scenarios obsolete.

== Key concepts ==
A central concept in Western modern naval fleet warfare is battlespace: a zone around a naval force within which a commander is confident of detecting, tracking, engaging and destroying threats before they pose a danger. As in all forms of warfare, a critical objective is to detect the enemy while avoiding detection.

The open sea provides the most favorable battlespace for a surface fleet. The presence of land and the topography of an area compress the battlespace, limit the opportunities to maneuver, make it easier for an enemy to predict the location of the fleet, and make the detection of enemy forces more difficult. In shallow waters, the detection of submarines and mines is especially problematic.

One scenario that was the focus of American and NATO naval planning during the Cold War was a conflict between two modern and well equipped fleets on the high seas, the clash of the United States/NATO and the Soviet Union/Warsaw Pact. Because the Cold War ended without direct total war between the two sides, the outcome of such an action remains hypothetical, but was broadly understood to include, towards the late Cold War, multiple salvoes of anti-ship missiles against the Americans and U.S. attempts to air strike Soviet land bases and/or fleets. Given the eventual strategic surprise effectiveness of anti-ship missiles, the outcome of such a clash is far from being clear.

The main consideration is for carrier battle group (CVBGs). Critics of current naval doctrine argue that although such a fleet battle is unlikely to occur in the foreseeable future, Cold War thinking continues to dominate naval practice. However, others point toward the increased naval budgets of Russia and South and East Asia as a possibility that conventional naval combat in the future may become relevant again.

Naval tactics and weapons systems can be categorized by the type of opponents they are intended to fight. Anti-air warfare (AAW) involves action against aircraft and incoming missiles. Anti-surface warfare (ASuW) focuses on attacking and defending against surface warships. Anti-submarine warfare (ASW) deals with the detection and destruction of enemy submarines.

The key threat in modern naval combat is the airborne cruise missile, which can be delivered from surface, subsurface or airborne platforms. With missile speeds ranging up to Mach 4, engagement time may be only seconds and such missiles can be designed to "skim the sea" mere meters above the sea surface. The key to successful defence was argued to be to destroy the launch platform before it fires, thus removing a number of missile threats at once. This is not always possible so the anti-aircraft warfare (AAW) resources need to be balanced between the outer and inner air battles. Missile tactics are now mostly fire and forget in the manner of the Harpoon or Exocet or utilize over-the-horizon targeting, such as the Tomahawk or Silkworm. Close-range missile defence in the modern age depends heavily on close-in weapon systems (CIWS) such as the Phalanx or Goalkeeper.

Most naval vessels can only withstand one or two missile strikes before they are put out of commission. In the 1970s, defense planners began developing backup defenses like the Sea Sparrow missile and CIWS. Large navies like the US Navy responded to the advent of missiles by adopting a “haystack” distribution with ships that are more dispersed to protect major targets like aircraft carriers. The 1985 article “Cruise Missile Warfare” in US Naval Institute's Proceedings used a relationship proposed by the Brookings Institution to assess the likeliness a ship would be put out of commission by missile damage. The number of hits needed to put a ship out of action is related to the length of the ship. A hit by a modern warhead would incapacitate a modern 300-foot long warship. Another similar sized warhead is needed for each additional 100 feet.

Though traveling under water and at lower speeds, torpedoes present a similar threat. As is the case with missiles, torpedoes are self-propelled and can be launched from surface, subsurface, and air platforms. Modern versions of this weapon present a wide selection of homing technologies specially suited to their particular target. There are far fewer means of destroying incoming torpedoes compared to missiles.

Submarines, as subsurface launching platforms, present an important threat to conventional naval operations. Anechoic coatings and ultra-quiet pump-jets provide modern submarines with the advantage of stealth. The move towards shallow water operations has greatly increased this advantage. Mere suspicion of a submarine threat can force a fleet to commit resources to removing it, as the consequences of an undetected enemy submarine can obviously be lethal. The threat posed by British submarines during the Falklands War of 1982 was one of the reasons why the Argentine Navy was limited in its operations. A single submarine at sea also impacted operations in the Indo-Pakistani Naval War of 1971.

Conventional naval forces are also seen as providing a capability for power projection. In several naval operations, the aircraft carrier has been used to support land forces rather than to supply air control over the sea. Carriers were used in this way during the Gulf War.

== History ==
Naval tactics have evolved over time with developments in naval technology and the evolution of warships. The evolution of naval tactics can best be understood by dividing naval history into thematic topics:

- Galley tactics: Naval tactics from the earliest times to the Battle of Lepanto (1571), the last major battle in which (oar-propelled) galleys dominated.
- Sailing ship tactics: Tactics focused on sailing warships, especially from the late 16th century, including the development of the line of battle.
- Naval tactics in the Age of Steam: The development of the steam-powered ironclad firing explosive shells lead to new tactics that were developed for the big-gun Dreadnought battleships. The mine, torpedo, submarine and aircraft posed new threats, each of which had to be countered, leading to tactical developments such as anti-submarine warfare and the use of dazzle camouflage. By the end of the steam age, aircraft carriers and submarines had replaced battleships as the principal units of the fleet.

The modern period of naval tactics began with the widespread replacement of naval guns with missiles and long-range combat aircraft after World War II and is the basis for most of the tactical doctrine used today.

=== Post-World War II conflicts ===
==== The Indo-Pakistani Naval War of 1971 ====
The Indo-Pakistani War of 1971 was the most significant conflict involving naval forces since World War II. Over two thousand sailors died, and multiple ships were sunk. Significantly, the first submarine sinking of a ship since World War II occurred when the Pakistani submarine PNS Hangor sank an Indian ASW frigate INS Khukri. Passive/active sonar, homing torpedoes, air strikes on naval facilities and fast missile craft were all utilized in this war.

In the western theatre of the war, the Indian Navy successfully attacked Karachi's port in Operation Trident on the night of 4–5 December, using missile boats, sinking Pakistani destroyer PNS Khaibar and minesweeper PNS Muhafiz; PNS Shah Jahan was also badly damaged. In response, Pakistani submarines sought out major Indian warships. 720 Pakistani sailors were killed or wounded, and Pakistan lost reserve fuel and many commercial ships, thus crippling the Pakistan Navy's further involvement in the conflict. Operation Trident was followed by Operation Python on the night of 8–9 December, in which Indian missile boats attacked the Karachi port, resulting in further destruction of reserve fuel tanks and the sinking of three Pakistani merchant ships. Since Pakistan's naval headquarters and almost its entire fleet operated from the port city of Karachi, this was a major strategic victory that enabled the Indian navy to attain complete naval superiority, and to partially blockade Pakistan.

In the eastern theatre of the war, the Indian Eastern Naval Command completely isolated East Pakistan by a naval blockade in the Bay of Bengal, trapping the Eastern Pakistani Navy and eight foreign merchant ships in their ports. From 4 December onwards, the aircraft carrier INS Vikrant was deployed, and its Sea Hawk fighter-bombers attacked many coastal towns in East Pakistan including Chittagong and Cox's Bazar. Pakistan countered the threat by sending the submarine PNS Ghazi, which sank en route under mysterious circumstances off Visakhapatnam's coast On 9 December, the Indian Navy suffered its biggest wartime loss when the Pakistani submarine Hangor sank the frigate Khukri in the Arabian Sea, resulting in a loss of 18 officers and 176 sailors.

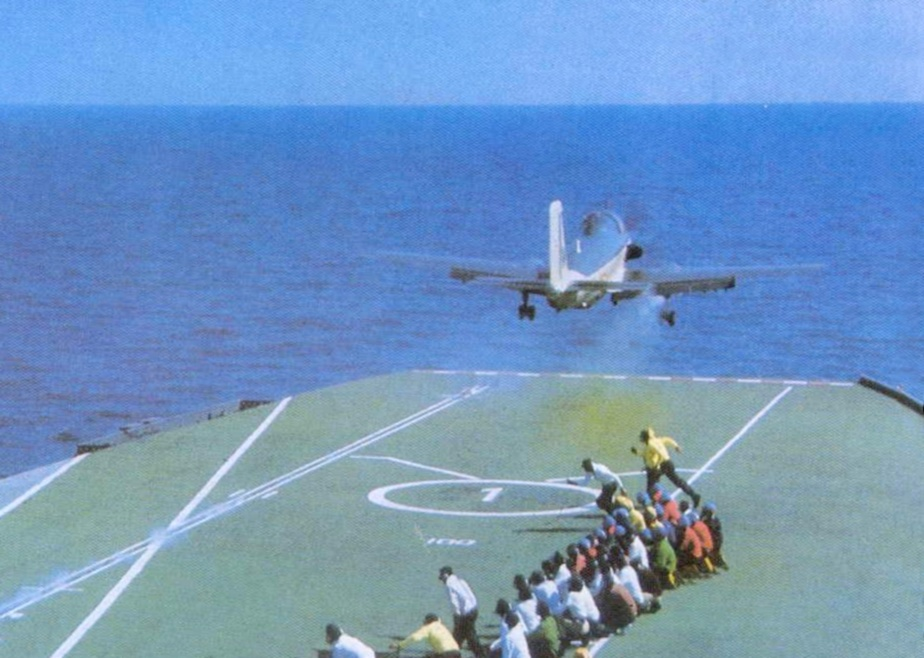
Indian aircraft carrier INS Vikrant launches an Alize aircraft

The damage inflicted on the Pakistani Navy stood at 7 gunboats, 1 minesweeper, 1 submarine, 2 destroyers, 3 patrol crafts belonging to the coast guard, 18 cargo, supply and communication vessels, and large scale damage inflicted on the naval base and docks in the coastal town of Karachi. Three merchant navy ships – Anwar Baksh, Pasni and Madhumathi – and ten smaller vessels were captured. Around 1900 personnel were lost, while 1413 servicemen were captured by Indian forces in Dhaka. According to one Pakistan scholar, Tariq Ali, Pakistan lost half its navy in the war.

==== The Falklands War ====
The Falklands War of 1982 has been the next most significant conflict involving naval forces since World War II. The primary combat was between the Argentine Air force, based on the mainland, and the British naval force centered on aircraft carriers. Argentine naval forces played only a minor role in the conflict.

The war demonstrated the importance of naval airborne early warning (AEW). Vital to British success was the protection of the two Royal Navy aircraft carriers, HMS Hermes and HMS Invincible. In 1982, the Royal Navy had effectively zero over-the-horizon radar capability, so to protect the British naval taskforce several destroyers and frigates were sent on radar picket duty to form the first line of defense against Argentine air attacks. As a result, the British lost the Type 42 destroyer HMS Sheffield to fire following an Argentine Exocet missile strike. Following the conflict, the Royal Navy modified some Westland Sea King helicopters for the AEW role. Other navies (including France, Spain and Italy) have since included AEW aircraft or helicopters on their carriers.

The conflict also led to an increased interest in the close defense capabilities of naval ships, including close-in weapon systems (CIWS) as a last-ditch defense against incoming missiles. The attack on the US frigate USS Stark on patrol in the Persian Gulf in 1987 also highlighted the danger of anti-ship missiles. In the case of Stark, the Iraqi Exocet missiles were not detected and Stark's CIWS was not turned on as the ship was not expecting an attack.

The Falklands War also saw the first time a warship has been sunk by a nuclear-powered submarine in a hostile attack, when the British nuclear-powered submarine HMS Conqueror attacked the Argentine cruiser ARA General Belgrano with torpedoes. With their nuclear propulsion plants, the submarines were able to remain on station virtually undetected. Until the Sinking of IRIS Dena by the American nuclear-powered submarine USS Charlotte (SSN-766) during the 2026 Iran war, the sinking of ARA General Belgrano marked the only instance in history of a warship being sunk in a hostile attack by a nuclear-powered submarine.

==== Other conflicts ====
Another large naval operation conducted by a major power took place when the US Navy provided protection to Kuwaiti-owned tankers in the Persian Gulf between 1987 and 1988, during the Iran–Iraq War. Post-war calculations indicate that Iraq used French-built Exocet missiles between 257 and 261 times. Iran did not have as many missiles but attacked 207 neutral ships with guns, mines, flotilla craft, and rocket propelled grenades. It also launched a total of nine Silkworm missiles. In total around 411 ships were attacked, 60 percent of which were tankers. The tonnage damaged beyond economic repair in the Tanker War by 1986 amounted to about 20 percent of all Allied tonnage sunk in World War II.

Naval forces have played a supporting role in some land battles. US battleships provided naval gunfire support during the Vietnam War and the 1991 Gulf War. During the Falklands War, British destroyers and frigates carried out shelling of Argentine positions.

The 1991 Croatian War and the subsequent War of Bosnia saw some naval action, initially when the Yugoslav Navy declared a blockade of the ports of Dalmatia from September to December 1991 and later in 1994–1995, when NATO naval forces, as part of Operation Sharp Guard, deployed a number of units to the Adriatic in order to enforce a United Nations arms embargo on former Yugoslavia. Later Operations on former Yugoslavia such as Deliberate Force and Allied Force involved the use of seaborne aircraft and the launch of Tomahawk cruise missiles against Serb targets. British and Australian warships provided gunfire support to the Al Faw operation during the 2003 invasion of Iraq. US and UK naval forces have used again Tomahawk cruise missiles against land targets in the course of actions undertaken since the end of the Cold War, such as the opening of international involvement in the Libyan Civil War, of which the British Armed Forces played a decisive role.

The USS Cole bombing, a suicide waterborne mission on a US Aegis destroyer in Yemen in October 2000, has resulted in an increased awareness of terrorist risks whilst warships are in harbor or near potentially hostile coastlines. The war on terrorism has also seen increased awareness of the naval role against terrorism. The US-led invasion of Afghanistan reaffirmed the role of naval air power, and US carrier based aircraft provided most of the sorties over Afghanistan against Taliban and Al-Qaeda forces. Over 90% of munitions delivered by the US Navy in Operation Enduring Freedom were precision-guided munitions. Several nations contributed vessels and maritime patrol aircraft to deny Al-Qaeda access to the Arabian Sea and Indian Ocean, including the US, Australia, Britain, Canada, Germany, Netherlands and New Zealand amongst others. France and Italy also used their carrier based aircraft over Afghanistan. Special forces operated from US and British carriers, in particular, the USS Kitty Hawk. Aircraft traditionally used for maritime patrol such as the Nimrod and P-3 Orion were also used in the overland surveillance role over Afghanistan as well as during the 2003 invasion of Iraq.
