= List of shipwrecks in August 1943 =

The list of shipwrecks in August 1943 includes ships sunk, foundered, grounded, or otherwise lost during August 1943.

== 1 August ==
List of shipwrecks: 1 August 1943
Ship	State	Description
Bagé	Brazil	World War II: Convoy TJ 2: The cargo liner was ordered to leave the convoy because she was making excessive smoke. She was torpedoed, shelled and sunk in the Atlantic Ocean off Sergipe (11°29′S 36°58′W) by U-185 (Kriegsmarine) with the loss of 28 of the 134 people aboard.
Bari	Italy	World War II: The cargo ship was bombed and damaged at Naples by Allied aircraft. She was beached in a sinking condition. She was refloated in March 1949 and scrapped.
Mangkalihat	Netherlands	World War II: Convoy BC 2: The cargo ship (8,457 GRT, 1928) was torpedoed and damaged in the Indian Ocean (25°06′S 34°14′E) by U-198 (Kriegsmarine) with the loss of eighteen of the 104 people aboard. Survivors were rescued by HMS Freesia (Royal Navy). Mangkalihat was taken in tow, but foundered on 4 August at 25°44′S 33°32′E.
Normandiet	Denmark	The cargo ship (3,161 GRT) collided with Maasburg (Netherlands) in the Elbe, She broke in two and sank. The wreck was dispersed in 1948. The whole crew was rescued.
USS PT-117	United States Navy	World War II: The Elco 80' PT boat was beached and abandoned after being bombed by Japanese dive bombers in Rendova Harbour (08°24′S 157°19′E). One crew was killed.
USS PT-164	United States Navy	World War II: The Elco 80' PT boat was bombed and sunk by Japanese horizontal bombers in Rendova Harbor, Solomon Islands (08°25′S 157°20′E). One crew was killed.
U-383	Kriegsmarine	World War II: The Type VIIC submarine was depth charged and sunk in the Bay of Biscay west of Brest, Finistère, France (47°24′N 12°10′W) by a Short Sunderland aircraft of 228 Squadron, Royal Air Force with the loss of all 52 crew.
U-454	Kriegsmarine	World War II: The Type VIIC submarine was depth charged and sunk in the Bay of Biscay north west of Cape Ortegal, Spain (45°36′N 10°32′W) by a Short Sunderland aircraft on 10 Squadron, Royal Australian Air Force with the loss of 32 of her 46 crew.
Uskside	United Kingdom	World War II: The cargo ship was bombed and sunk at Palermo, Sicily, Italy by Axis aircraft with the loss of one of her 43 crew. She was refloated in 1946, repaired and entered Italian service as Teseo.

== 2 August ==
List of shipwrecks: 2 August 1943
Ship	State	Description
Emanuel	Germany	World War II: The ship was sunk by a mine in the Black Sea off Mariupol.
Fortuna	Germany	World War II: The cargo ship (2,666 GRT) was torpedoed and sunk in the North Sea off Terschelling, Friesland, Netherlands by Royal Air Force Bristol Beaufighter aircraft. Six crew were killed.
Gyoraitei No. 112	Imperial Japanese Navy	World War II: The Gyoraitei No. 102/TM 4-class motor torpedo boat was sunk by Lockheed P-38 Lightning and North American B-25 Mitchell aircraft at Lae, New Guinea (07°00′N 147°00′E).
Gyoraitei No. 113	Imperial Japanese Navy	World War II: The Gyoraitei No. 102/TM 4-class motor torpedo boat was sunk by Lockheed P-38 Lightning and North American B-25 Mitchell aircraft at Lae, New Guinea (07°00′N 147°00′E).
Nuova Speranza	Italy	The motor sailboat (53 GRT) sank for an unknown reason at Milazzo, Sicily, Italy.
USS PT-109	United States Navy	World War II: The Elco 80-foot PT boat was rammed, cut in half, and sunk in Blackett Strait (08°03′S 156°58′E) by the destroyer Amagiri (Imperial Japanese Navy). Two crewmen were killed. There were 11 survivors.
Pierre	Germany	World War II: The lighter was sunk by a mine laid by Soviet aircraft in the Black Sea off Ochakov.
Romagna	Italy	World War II: The tanker hit a mine and sank in the Mediterranean Sea off Cagliari. There were 14 dead and 11 survivors.
U-106	Kriegsmarine	World War II: The Type IXB submarine was depth charged and sunk in the Atlantic Ocean north west of Cape Ortegal, Spain (46°35′N 11°55′W) by Short Sunderland aircraft of 228 Squadron, Royal Air Force and 461 Squadron, Royal Australian Air Force with the loss of 22 of her 58 crew.
U-706	Kriegsmarine	World War II: The Type VIIC submarine was depth charged and sunk in the Bay of Biscay northwest of Cape Ortegal, Spain (46°15′N 10°25′W) by a Royal Canadian Air Force Handley Page Hampden aircraft of 415 Squadron and a United States Navy Consolidated PB4Y-1 Liberator aircraft with the loss of 42 of her 46 crew.
V 420 Alcyon	Kriegsmarine	World War II: The naval trawler/Vorpostenboot was sunk off the Gironde estuary by Royal Air Force aircraft. Two crew were killed and 7 wounded according to initial report, but 5 crew were killed according to another source and the names of 8 crew who died this day are known.
V 1108 Arctur	Kriegsmarine	World War II: The Vorpostenboot was torpedoed and sunk in the North Sea off Texel, North Holland, Netherlands by Royal Air Force aircraft. 13 crew were killed.

== 3 August ==
List of shipwrecks: 3 August 1943
Ship	State	Description
Argento	Regia Marina	World War II: The Acciaio-class submarine was depth charged and sunk in the Mediterranean Sea (36°52′N 12°08′E) by the destroyer USS Buck (United States Navy) with the loss of four of her 49 crew. The survivors were taken aboard Buck as prisoners of war.
Città di Catania	Italy	World War II: The ship (3,355 GRT) was torpedoed and sunk in the Mediterranean Sea off Brindisi, Italy (40°30′N 18°04′E) by the submarine HMS Unruffled (Royal Navy). There were 242 or 256 dead depending on sources.
City of Oran	United Kingdom	World War II: Convoy CB 1: The cargo ship (7,323 GRT, 1915) was torpedoed and damaged in the Indian Ocean 100 nautical miles (190 km) northeast of Memba Bay, Portuguese East Africa (13°45′S 41°16′E), by the submarine U-196 (Kriegsmarine). All 86 crew were rescued by HMS Masterful (Royal Navy), which scuttled the vessel.
F 430	Kriegsmarine	World War II: The Type C Marinefahrprahm was sunk by an air attack at Paola, Calabria, Italy. There was no casualty.
S-12	Soviet Navy	World War II: The S-class submarine struck a mine and sank in the Baltic Sea north of Naissaay Island with all 46 hands.
San Michele Arcangelo	Italy	World War II: The schooner (28 GRT) was destroyed by fire off Catania, Sicily, Italy.
SKR-14 Priliv	Soviet Navy	World War II: The guard ship was sunk off Cape Set-Novoloc by German Focke-Wulf Fw 190 fighter-bomber aircraft. Two crew were killed and one wounded.
Tyee Scout	United States	During a voyage to Cape Spencer in Southeast Alaska, the 23-gross register ton, 49.8-foot (15.2 m) fishing vessel was wrecked on the coast of the Territory of Alaska at latitude 58 00 20 North.
U-572	Kriegsmarine	World War II: The Type VIIC submarine was depth charged and sunk in the Atlantic Ocean northeast of Trinidad (11°35′N 54°05′W) by a United States Navy Martin PBM Mariner flying boat with the loss of all 47 crew.
Wickenburgh	Netherlands	The cargo ship (779 or 730 GRT, 1928) ran aground off Lagos, Nigeria. She was abandoned on 14 January 1944.
Yankee Arrow	United States	World War II: The tanker hit a mine off Bizerte, Tunisia. Five crew and two Armed Guard gunners were killed. She reached port under her own power, but was deemed damaged beyond repair.

== 4 August ==
List of shipwrecks: 4 August 1943
Ship	State	Description
HMS Arrow	Royal Navy	The A-class destroyer (1,350/1,765 t, 1930) was set on fire and severely damaged by the explosion of Fort La Montee (United Kingdom) at Algiers. Although she was towed to Taranto, Apulia, Italy for repairs, she was subsequently declared a constructive total loss and was scrapped in 1949. 28 crew were killed and 8 more died of wounds in the next days.
B10 Bella Italia	Regia Marina	World War II: The auxiliary minesweeper was bombed and sunk during an American air raid on Naples, Italy.
Catania	Italy	World War II: The cargo ship was heavily damaged during an American air raid on Naples, Italy. She was scuttled by the Germans on 15 September. She was refloated in 1947 and scrapped in 1949.
Dalfram	United Kingdom	World War II: The cargo ship (4,558 GRT, 1930) was torpedoed and sunk in the Indian Ocean east of Madagascar (20°53′S 56°43′E) by U-181 (Kriegsmarine) with the loss of three of her 43 crew.
Fort La Montee	United Kingdom	The ammunition cargo of the Fort ship (7,134 GRT, 1942) caught fire, and she exploded and sank at Algiers, Algeria. 17 crew and 5 armed gunners were killed, 2 crew and 1 armed gunner died of their wounds in the following days. There were also many casualties aboard HMS Arrow and in the port.
Harrison Gray Otis	United States	World War II: The Liberty ship was sunk at Gibraltar by an Italian limpet mine. Depending on sources one or two crew died or died of wounds. She was a total loss and was scrapped in 1949.
Kaisho Maru	Imperial Japanese Army	World War II: The Horaisan Maru-class auxiliary transport ship was torpedoed and sunk in the Java Sea south of Borneo off Cape Atein (05°18′S 111°50′E) by USS Finback (United States Navy). 196 passengers, including 57 Japanese and 139 Javanese, and 47 crewmen were killed.
Lombardia	Italy	World War II: The troopship, badly damaged on 4 April 1943 by an air raid at Naples and laying since then half-sunk in the port, was bombed again and sunk during an American air raid. She was refloated 1946–47 and scrapped 1947–48.
Pallade	Regia Marina	World War II: The Spica-class torpedo boat was heavily damaged during an American air raid on Naples, and capsized and sank the next day. Two crew were killed.
Santagata	Italy	World War II: The cargo ship was sunk during an American air raid on Naples. The wreck was scrapped in situ.
SAT-1 Ost	Kriegsmarine	World War II: The heavy gun carrier was sunk in the Baltic Sea by Soviet aircraft or by a mine. 28 crew were lost.
RFA Thorshøvdi	Royal Fleet Auxiliary	World War II: The tanker (9,944 GRT, 1937) was sunk at Gibraltar by an Italian limpet mine or manned torpedo. She was declared a total loss on 9 April 1945. Subsequently repaired and entered Norwegian service in 1946 as Giert Torgersen.
U-489	Kriegsmarine	World War II: The Type XIV submarine was depth charged and sunk in the Atlantic Ocean south east of Iceland (61°11′N 14°38′W) by a Consolidated PBY Catalina aircraft of 423 Squadron, Royal Canadian Air Force with the loss of one of her 54 crew.

== 5 August ==
List of shipwrecks: 5 August 1943
Ship	State	Description
B281 S. Guiseppe N	Regia Marina	World War II: The auxiliary minesweeper (30 GRT) was scuttled at Catania, Sicily. She was later raised and resumed service.
Efthalia Mari	Greece	World War II: The cargo ship (4,195 GRT, 1919) was torpedoed and sunk in the Indian Ocean (24°21′S 48°55′E) by U-177 (Kriegsmarine) with the loss of one of her 43 crew.
El Mansourah	Egypt	World War II: The cargo ship (140 GRT) was sunk by aircraft in the Mediterranean Sea 60 miles off Cyprus. The whole crew was saved.
Gazella	Regia Marina	World War II: The corvette struck a mine and sank in the Mediterranean Sea north of Asinara, Sardinia. 79 crew were killed, 36 survived.
Majakovski	Soviet Union	World War II: The boat struck a mine and sank in the Kara Sea (68°40′N 51°51′E).
Olga	Denmark	World War II: The fishing boat was sunk by an explosion, probably due to a mine, in the Kattegat east of Hjelm, Denmark. The crew was rescued.
USS Plymouth	United States Navy	World War II: The gunboat was torpedoed and sunk in the Atlantic Ocean 90 nautical miles (170 km) east of Elizabeth City, New Jersey (36°17′N 74°29′W) by U-566 (Kriegsmarine) with the loss of 70 of her 155 crew. Survivors were rescued by USCGC Calypso (United States Coast Guard).
HMT Red Gauntlet	Royal Navy	World War II: The 133.7-foot (40.8 m), 388-ton minesweeping naval trawler (338 GRT, 1930) was torpedoed and sunk in the North Sea off Harwich, Essex by S-86 (Kriegsmarine) with the loss of all 21 crew.
SF 177	Kriegsmarine	World War II: The Siebel ferry was heavily damaged by Allied fighter-bomber aircraft in the Strait of Messina. Seven crew were wounded. She was no longer able to sail and was scuttled at Catona, Calabria, Italy on 16 August.
Shoju Maru	Japan	World War II: The cargo ship (1,992 GRT) was torpedoed and sunk off Marcus Island (28°30′N 158°50′E) by USS Pike (United States Navy). 26 crew were killed.
Ss. Annuzantia S	Italy	World War II: The fishing boat (18 GRT) was bombed and sunk during an air attack on Reggio Calabria, Italy.
U-34	Kriegsmarine	The Type VIIA submarine collided with Lech (Kriegsmarine) at Memel, Lithuania and sank with the loss of four of her 43 crew. She was raised on 24 August and later scrapped.

== 6 August ==
List of shipwrecks: 6 August 1943
Ship	State	Description
Arashi	Imperial Japanese Navy	World War II: Battle of Vella Gulf: The Kagerō-class destroyer was torpedoed and sunk in Vella Gulf between Kolombangara and Vella Lavella (07°50′S 156°55′E) by the destroyers USS Craven, USS Dunlap and USS Maury (all United States Navy). 178 crew were killed with an unknown number of troops (685 troops carried by the three lost destroyers died in the battle).
Brindisi	Regia Marina	World War II: The auxiliary cruiser was torpedoed and sunk in the Mediterranean Sea off Bari, Italy by the submarine HMS Uproar (Royal Navy). Ten crew were lost. There were 102 survivors.
F 429	Kriegsmarine	World War II: The Type C Marinefahrprahm was set on fire by Allied fighter-bomber aircraft at Nicotera, Calabria, Italy, and was destroyed when her ammunition cargo exploded. There were four dead and sevenwounded.
Fort Halkett	United Kingdom	World War II: The Fort ship (7,133 GRT, 1942) was torpedoed, shelled and sunk in the South Atlantic 600 nautical miles (1,100 km) south east of Natal, Brazil (9°30′S 25°50′W) by U-185 (Kriegsmarine). All 59 crew survived; they were rescued by the destroyer USS Goldsborough (United States Navy) or reached land in their lifeboats.
Hagikaze	Imperial Japanese Navy	World War II: Battle of Vella Gulf: The Kagerō-class destroyer was torpedoed and sunk in Vella Gulf between Kolombangara and Vella Lavella (07°50′S 156°55′E) by the destroyers USS Craven, USS Dunlap and USS Maury (all United States Navy). 178 crew were killed with an unknown number of troops (685 troops carried by the three lost destroyers died in the battle).
Kawakaze	Imperial Japanese Navy	World War II: Battle of Vella Gulf: The Shiratsuyu-class destroyer was torpedoed and sunk in Vella Gulf between Kolombangara and Vella Lavella (07°50′S 156°55′E) by the destroyers USS Craven, USS Dunlap and USS Maury (all United States Navy). 169 crew were killed with an unknown number of troops (685 troops carried by the three lost destroyers died in the battle).
Macumba	Australia	World War II: The cargo ship (2,526 GRT, 1919) was bombed and sunk by Japanese aircraft north of Crocodile Islands, Australia (11°30′S 134°40′E). Three crew were killed.
MZ 756	Regia Marina	World War II: The Type A Marinefahrprahm was sunk by Allied aircraft off Gioia Tauro, Calabria, Italy. There were no casualty.
MZ 775	Regia Marina	World War II: The Type A Marinefahrprahm was sunk by Allied aircraft off Ganzirri, Sicily. There were no casualty.

== 7 August ==
List of shipwrecks: 7 August 1943
Ship	State	Description
Contractor	United Kingdom	World War II: Convoy GTX 5: The cargo ship (6,004 GRT, 1930) was torpedoed and sunk in the Mediterranean Sea 75 nautical miles (139 km) south west of Sardinia, Italy (37°15′N 7°21′E) by U-371 (Kriegsmarine) with the loss of four of her 83 crew. Survivors were rescued by HMS BYMS-2011, HMS BYMS-2014, HMS BYMS-2024 and HMS BYMS-2209 (all Royal Navy).
Delfino	Italy	World War II: The coaster (53 GRT) was bombed and sunk by Allied aircraft on the coast of Calabria, Italy.
F 440	Kriegsmarine	World War II: The Type C Marinefahrprahm was badly damaged by Allied fighter-bomber aircraft off Bagnara. She was run aground and later scuttled. One crew was wounded.
Fernhill	Norway	World War II: The cargo ship (4,116 GRT, 1926) was torpedoed and sunk in the Atlantic Ocean (6°58′N 19°15′W) by U-757 (Kriegsmarine) with the loss of four of her 44 crew. One survivor was taken aboard U-757 as a prisoner of war. The other survivors were rescued by Idaho (United States).
G12 Tenax	Regia Marina	World War II: The auxiliary minesweeper (212 GRT) was bombed and strafed by Allied aircraft in the Strait of Messina and was seriously damaged. She was run aground near the mouth of the Petrace south of Gioia Tauro, Italy, and was abandoned.
Mary Ellen	United States	The 15-gross register ton, 38.9-foot (11.9 m) fishing vessel was destroyed by fire at Icy Point in Southeast Alaska.
MZ 787	Regia Marina	World War II: The Type A Marinefahrprahm was bombed and sunk by Allied aircraft off Bagnara Calabra, Italy. There were no casualty.
Nantaise	Germany	World War II: The cargo ship was torpedoed and sunk in the Aegean Sea west of Tenedos island, Turkey by HMS Rorqual (Royal Navy). There was no loss of life.
Petrash	Soviet Union	World War II: The tug was sunk in the Black Sea by S 52 and S 72 (both Kriegsmarine). There were 25 dead and 28 survivors.
PiLB 59	Kriegsmarine	World War II: The PiLB 39 Type personnel landing craft was strafed and sunk off Faro Point, Sicily, by Allied aircraft. Two crew were killed. There were five survivors.
SF 86	Kriegsmarine	World War II: The Siebel ferry was set afire by Supermarine Spitfire aircraft in the Strait of Messina, was beached and burned.
U-84	Kriegsmarine	World War II: The Type VIIC submarine was torpedoed and sunk in the Atlantic Ocean (27°55′N 68°03′W) by a Consolidated PB4Y Liberator aircraft of the United States Navy with the loss of all 46 crew.
U-117	Kriegsmarine	World War II: The Type XB submarine (éè&à GRT) was sunk in the North Atlantic by depth charges and torpedoes dropped by a Grumman TBM Avenger aircraft from USS Card (United States Navy). All 61 crew aboard were killed. Two crew survived as they were aboard U-66 (Kriegsmarine) when the attack started.
U-615	Kriegsmarine	World War II: The Type VIIC submarine was depth charged and sunk in the Caribbean Sea (12°38′N 65°15′W) by six Martin PBM Mariner and a Lockheed Ventura aircraft of the United States Navy with the loss of four of her 47 crew.
Umvuma	United Kingdom	World War II: The cargo ship (4,419 GRT, 1914) was torpedoed and sunk in the Indian Ocean south east of Port Louis, Mauritius (20°18′S 57°14′E) by U-181 (Kriegsmarine) with the loss of 22 of the 111 people aboard. Survivors were rescued by Maurice (United Kingdom).

== 8 August ==
List of shipwrecks: 8 August 1943
Ship	State	Description
F 398	Kriegsmarine	World War II: The Type C Marinefahrprahm was attacked by Allied aircraft off Pizzo, Calabria and ran aground. She was scuttled the next day.
F 412	Kriegsmarine	World War II: The Type C Marinefahrprahm was attacked by Allied aircraft off Pizzo, Calabria and ran aground. She was scuttled the next day.
F 434	Kriegsmarine	World War II: The Type C Marinefahrprahm was attacked and sunk by Allied aircraft off Pizzo, Calabria.
F 437	Kriegsmarine	World War II: The Type C Marinefahrprahm ran aground at Vibo Valentia, Calabria, Italy. Attempts to tow her failed and she was scuttled on 19 August. She was salvaged and put in Italian service as MTC-1104 (Italian Navy) in May 1950.
F 618	Kriegsmarine	World War II: The Type C Marinefahrprahm was attacked by Allied aircraft off Pizzo, Calabria and ran aground. She was scuttled the next day.
Freccia	Regia Marina	World War II: The Freccia-class destroyer was bombed and sunk at Genoa, Italy by Royal Air Force aircraft. Her crew lost 6 killed and 50 wounded.
Gyoraitei 112	Imperial Japanese Navy	World War II: The torpedo boat was sunk in the Pacific Ocean off Lae, New Guinea by North American B-25 Mitchell and Lockheed P-38 Lightning aircraft of the United States Army Air Force.
Gyoraitei 113	Imperial Japanese Navy	World War II: The torpedo boat was sunk in the Pacific Ocean off Lae by North American B-25 Mitchell and Lockheed P-38 Lightning aircraft of the United States Army Air Force.
HMMGB 64	Royal Navy	The BPB 70'-class motor gunboat foundered in high seas in Dover Strait after her whole crew had been picked up.
Naruto Maru	Imperial Japanese Navy	World War II: The Naturo Maru-class auxiliary ammunition ship was torpedoed and sunk in the Pacific Ocean east of the Bonin Islands (24°03′N 142°45′E) by USS Whale (United States Navy). Four crewmen, 14 gunners and 12 passengers were killed. 300 people were rescued by Asanagi (Imperial Japanese Navy).
PiLB 264	Kriegsmarine	The PiLB 40 type landing craft sank after hitting a reef near Nicotera, Italy.
USS PT-113	United States Navy	The Elco 80' PT boat was beached and abandoned after running aground on Veale Reef (09°12′S 146°29′E) near Tufi, New Guinea.
TKA-73	Soviet Navy	World War II: The G-5-class motor torpedo boat was sunk by a mine near the Neugrund Bank in the Gulf of Finland.
Tozan Maru	Imperial Japanese Navy	The Kazan Maru-class auxiliary transport (a.k.a. Tangshan Maru) ran aground west of Erimo-Misaki (41°57′N 143°12′E). Attempts to refloat the vessel were unsuccessful. She sank on 20 August with part of her bridge above water.
XX Settembre	Italy	World War II: The barge (41 GRT) was sunk at Genoa, Italy by Royal Air Force aircraft.

== 9 August ==
List of shipwrecks: 9 August 1943
Ship	State	Description
USS LCT-311	United States Navy	World War II: The LCT Mk 5-class landing craft tank sank off Bizerte, Tunisia, after being shelled previously off Sicily.
USS LST-318	United States Navy	World War II: The LST-1-class tank landing ship was damaged by German fighter-bombers off the north shore of Sicily near Coronia (38°04′N 14°30′E) and was beached to avoid sinking. 20 crew were wounded. The beached LST was again bombed the next day and was abandoned.
M 5602 Cuckuck	Kriegsmarine	The naval drifter/minesweeper collided with U-212 (Kriegsmarine) and sank south of Kristiansand, Norway.
Sekko Maru	Japan	World War II: The cargo ship was torpedoed and sunk in the South China Sea off Formosa by USS Sculpin (United States Navy). The whole crew was saved.
TID 12	United Kingdom	The TID-class tug was driven ashore at Tarlair Point, Banffshire. She was refloated on 12 August and towed in to Macduff, Aberdeenshire.
TID 14	United Kingdom	The TID-class tug was driven ashore at Tarlair Point. She was refloated on 12 August and towed into Macduff.
U-664	Kriegsmarine	World War II: The Type VIIC submarine (1,070 GRT) was sunk in the Atlantic Ocean (40°12′N 37°29′W) by two Grumman TBM Avenger aircraft based on USS Card (United States Navy) with the loss of seven of her 51 crew.
Vincenzo Gioberti	Regia Marina	World War II: The Oriani-class destroyer was torpedoed and sunk in the Mediterranean Sea off La Spezia (44°04′N 09°32′E) by HMS Simoom (Royal Navy). 105 crew were killed. There were 171 survivors.

== 10 August ==
List of shipwrecks: 10 August 1943
Ship	State	Description
Asmara	Regia Marina	World War II: The transport ship was torpedoed and damaged in the Mediterranean Sea 3 nautical miles (5.6 km) east of Brindisi by HMS Unshaken (Royal Navy). She was beached, but capsized and sank the next day. Of her 157 crew, 2 were killed and 12 injured.
Boy Feddersen	Germany	World War II: The cargo ship was torpedoed and damaged by Ilyushin Il-4 aircraft off Crimea, Soviet Union. She was taken in tow for Sevastopol, but was torpedoed and sunk the next day (44°58′N 33°08′E) by D-4 (Soviet Navy). The crew was saved.
PiLB 101	Kriegsmarine	World War II: The PiLB 39 Type personnel landing craft was bombed and sunk near Ganzirri, Sicily. There were no casualty.
S. Giovanni Battista	Italy	The motor sailboat (52 GRT) sank for an unknown reason near the mouth of the Petrace, between Capo Vaticano and Palmi, Italy.
Wakanoura Maru	Japan	World War II: The cargo liner was torpedoed and sunk in the Pacific Ocean north of Hokkaido by USS Salmon (United States Navy). One passenger was killed.

== 11 August ==
List of shipwrecks: 11 August 1943
Ship	State	Description
F 435	Kriegsmarine	World War II: The Type C Marinefahrprahm was bombed at Gioia Tauro, Calabria, Italy, and run aground but was a total loss. She was salvaged and put in Italian service as MTC-1103 (Italian Navy) in May 1950.
Jutoku Maru	Japan	World War II: The cargo ship was bombed and sunk by a Consolidated B-24 Liberator aircraft in the Pacific Ocean north east of Lorengau, Manus Island (01°11′S 148°08′E).
MZ 701	Regia Marina	World War II: The Type A Marinefahrprahm was bombed and sunk by Allied aircraft off Vibo Valentia, Italy. There were no casualty.
S 121	Kriegsmarine	World War II: The Type 1939/40 motor torpedo boat was sunk off Aber-Vrac'h, France (48°35′N 4°30′W) in a British air attack with the loss of 12 lives.
TKA-95	Soviet Navy	World War II: The G-5-class motor torpedo boat was sunk by gunfire in the Black Sea off Cape Doob in a battle against S 26, S 49, S 51, S 52 and S 72 (all Kriegsmarine). 11 crew member were rescued by Soviet patrol boats.
U-468	Kriegsmarine	World War II: The Type VIIC submarine was depth charged and sunk in the Atlantic Ocean off Bathurst, Gambia (12°20′N 20°07′W) by a Consolidated B-24 Liberator aircraft of 200 Squadron, Royal Air Force with the loss of 44 of her 51 crew.
U-525	Kriegsmarine	World War II: The Type IXC/40 submarine (1,545 GRT) was depth charged, torpedoed and sunk in the Atlantic Ocean (40°12′N 37°29′W) by Grumman TBF Avenger and Grumman F4F Wildcat aircraft based on USS Card (United States Navy) with the loss of all 54 crew.
U-604	Kriegsmarine	World War II: The Type VIIC submarine was depth charged and damaged in the Atlantic Ocean (4°30′S 21°20′W) by a PV-1 aircraft of the United States Navy on 30 July and a PB4Y aircraft on 3 August. She was consequently scuttled on 11 August due to damage received (05°00′S 20°00′W). The whole crew was rescued by U-185 (Kriegsmarine), and she passed on some to U-172 (Kriegsmarine). Fourteen crewmen were killed when U-185 was sunk on 24 August.
Vincenzo	Italy	World War II: The schooner (243 GRT) was bombed and sunk by Allied aircraft off Lipari, Italy.

== 12 August ==
List of shipwrecks: 12 August 1943
Ship	State	Description
Clan Macarthur	United Kingdom	World War II: The cargo ship (10,528 GRT, 1936) was torpedoed and sunk in the Indian Ocean 350 nautical miles (650 km) east of Farafangana, Madagascar (23°00′S 53°11′E) by U-181 (Kriegsmarine) with the loss of 53 of the 130 people aboard. Survivors were rescued by Savorgnan de Brazza (Free French Naval Forces).
I-O-60	Kriegsmarine	World War II: The Siebelgefäß landing craft was sunk in the Strait of Messina by Allied fighter-bomber aircraft.
HSwMS Illern	Swedish Navy	The submarine collided with Birkaland (Sweden) in the Kalmar Strait, Baltic Sea and sank with the loss of one crew member.
Juno	Denmark	The fishing boat was driven ashore by a storm near Ebbeløkke, Denmark, and was wrecked with the loss of one crew.
V1 Marina e Wanda	Regia Marina	World War II: The auxiliary patrol boat (64 GRT) was destroyed by fire at Riposto, Sicily.

== 13 August ==
List of shipwrecks: 13 August 1943
Ship	State	Description
Argus	Germany	The cargo ship caught fire and was then sunk by the explosion of her cargo of ammunition at Hamnbukt, Porsanger Municipality, Norway. Depending on sources, 44 or at least 63 German soldiers who were fighting the fires were killed.
Edo Maru	Imperial Japanese Navy	World War II: The Hakutetsu Maru No. 11-class auxiliary gunboat was torpedoed and sunk in the Pacific Ocean 70 nautical miles (130 km; 81 mi) east south east of Iwo Jima (24°04′N 142°21′E) by USS Sunfish (United States Navy).
Empire Haven	United Kingdom	World War II: The cargo ship was torpedoed and damaged by aircraft north of Oran, Algeria (36°15′N 2°23′W). She was towed in to Gibraltar by a Royal Navy ship and laid there until June 1946, when she was repaired and returned to service.
Francis W. Pettygrove	United States	World War II: The Liberty ship was torpedoed and damaged off the Algerian coast (36°08′N 2°14′W) by Luftwaffe aircraft. There were no casualty. She was towed to Gibraltar and beached but was declared a constructive total loss.
USS John Penn	United States Navy	World War II: The John Penn-class attack transport was torpedoed and sunk off Guadalcanal by Japanese aircraft. 7 officers and 91 enlisted men of the crew were killed or missing.
M. H. de Young	United States	World War II: The Liberty ship was torpedoed and damaged in the Pacific Ocean off the Fiji Islands (21°50′S 175°10′E) by I-19 (Imperial Japanese Navy). Three crew and a US Navy sailor were killed. She was towed to Nukualofa, Tongatabu, but was not repairable and consequently became the hulk USS Antelope.
MT-2	Kriegsmarine	World War II: The tanker was sunk by a mine in the Black Sea.
PiLB 61	Kriegsmarine	World War II: The PiLB 39 Type personnel landing craft was bombed and sunk in Ganzirri, Sicily. There was no casualty.
R 6	Kriegsmarine	World War II: The Type R-2 minesweeper was bombed and sunk off Civitavecchia (42°24′N 11°35′E) by Royal Air Force aircraft. Two crew were killed and four wounded.
Verma	Norway	World War II: The cargo ship (155 GRT, 1891) struck a mine laid the same day by HNoMS MTB 623 (Royal Norwegian Navy) near Selje, Norway, and sank. All 8 crew survived.

== 14 August ==
List of shipwrecks: 14 August 1943
Ship	State	Description
Bob	Denmark	The fishing boat sank in a storm in the North Sea with all four hands.
Cuore di Maria	Italy	World War II: The fishing boat (33 GRT) was sunk during a naval and aerial attack on Vibo Valentia, Italy. She was later raised.
F 462	Kriegsmarine	World War II: The Type C Marinefahrprahm was bombed and sunk south of Vibo Valentia, Italy.
MZ 732	Regia Marina	World War II: The Type A Marinefahrprahm was sunk by Allied aircraft in the bay of Scilla, Calabria, Italy. There were no casualty.
MZ 755	Regia Marina	World War II: The Type A Marinefahrprahm was sunk by Allied aircraft off Capo dell'Armi Lighthouse, Calabria, Italy.
Neptun	Denmark	World War II: The fishing boat disappeared in the North Sea northwest of Esbjerg, Denmark, with all four hands, in an area where drifting mines were seen.
PiLB 316	Kriegsmarine	World War II: The PiLB 40 type landing craft was sunk by an air attack in the port of Vibo Valentia, Italy.
PiLF 32	Kriegsmarine	World War II: The Siebel ferry was sunk in the port of Vibo Valentia, Italy by Allied aircraft and ships.
PiLF 148	Kriegsmarine	World War II: The Siebel ferry was sunk in the port of Vibo Valentia, Italy by Allied aircraft and ships.
PiLF 242	Kriegsmarine	World War II: The Siebel ferry was sunk in the port of Vibo Valentia, Italy by Allied aircraft and ships.
HMS Saracen	Royal Navy	World War II: The S-class submarine (842/990 t, 1942) was depth charged and damaged in the Mediterranean Sea off Bastia, Corsica, France by Euterpe and Minerva (both Regia Marina). She was scuttled to prevent capture with the loss of two of her 48 crew. The survivors were taken as prisoners of war. Four died in captivity and a fifth after evading.
StuBo 1090	Kriegsmarine	World War II: The StuBo42 type landing craft/motor launch was sunk by Allied aircraft north of the Strait of Messina.
Vergine di Pompei	Italy	World War II: The motor sailboat (39 GRT) was bombed and sunk at Vibo Valentia, Italy during the night of 14 to 15 August.
USS YC-970	United States Navy	The non-self-propelled covered lighter was lost in Puget Sound, Washington.

== 15 August ==
List of shipwrecks: 15 August 1943
Ship	State	Description
Ammiraglio Giovanni Viotti	Italy	World War II: The steamer was sunk by Allied aircraft at Messina, Sicily.
Bajamonti	Italy	World War II: The steamer was sunk by Allied aircraft at Messina, Sicily. She was raised in 1945 and returned to Yugoslav service.
Cesco	Italy	World War II: The tanker was torpedoed and damaged in the Adriatic Sea east of Brindisi by HMS Unruly (Royal Navy). Cesco was beached. She was refloated in 1944 and laid up at Naples. She was scrapped in 1951.
Divina Provvidenza	Italy	World War II: The fishing boat (33 GRT) was hit during a night air raid on Vibo Valentia, Italy, and sank the next day. She was later raised.
Goggiam	Italy	World War II: The cargo ship was torpedoed and damaged in the Adriatic Sea east of Bari, Italy (41°09′N 17°25′E) by ORP Dzik (Polish Navy). Three of the 59 men aboard were killed. She was taken in tow by the tug Nettuno (Italy) and then beached, but was later declared to be a total loss.
Littorio	Italy	World War II: The tug was sunk by Allied aircraft at Messina, Sicily. She had been badly damaged by bombs during the night of 5 to 6 August and might have been scuttled.
HMS LST-414	Royal Navy	World War II: The landing ship tank (1,625/4,080 t, 1943) was torpedoed in the Mediterranean Sea off Bizerte, Tunisia by an Italian Savoia-Marchetti SM.79 Sparviero bomber aircraft, and was beached and abandoned. Two crew were killed.
HMS MTB 665	Royal Navy	World War II: The Fairmile D motor torpedo boat (102/118 t, 1943) was shelled and sunk off Messina, Sicily, Italy, by shore based artillery. Two crew were killed and the survivors were captured.
MZ 746	Regia Marina	World War II: The Type A Marinefahrprahm was damaged by Allied aircraft and was run aground near Siderno, Calabria, Italy. She was a total loss but there were no casualty.
MZ 774	Regia Marina	World War II: The Type A Marinefahrprahm was damaged by Allied aircraft and was run aground near Siderno, Calabria, Italy. She was a total loss but there were no casualty.
Piemonte	Italy	World War II: The cargo ship (15,209 GRT) was scuttled at Messina, Sicily where she laid since December 1942 after having been torpedoed.
PiLB 67	Kriegsmarine	World War II: The PiLB 39 Type personnel landing craft, previously damaged by an air attack, was sunk with explosives at Scilla, Calabria, Italy.
PiLB 211	Kriegsmarine	World War II: The PiLB 40 type landing craft was bombed and sunk near Canitello, Calabria, Italy.
SF 94	Kriegsmarine	World War II: The Siebel ferry was damaged by Allied aircraft off Punta Pezzo, Calabria, Italy. She was scuttled at Catona, Calabria, Italy on 16 August.
Warfield	United Kingdom	World War II: Convoy OS 53/KMS 23: The cargo ship was bombed and sunk in the Atlantic Ocean (39°59′N 12°58′W) by Focke-Wulf Fw 200 Condor aircraft of KG 40, Luftwaffe with the loss of two of her 96 crew.

== 16 August ==
List of shipwrecks: 16 August 1943
Ship	State	Description
Carridi	Italy	World War II: The disabled ferry ship was scuttled at Messina, Sicily as no tug was available to tow her to Italy. She was raised in 1949, repaired and resumed service in 1953.
Empire Kestrel	United Kingdom	World War II: The Design 1074 ship (2,674 GRT, 1919) was torpedoed and sunk in the Mediterranean Sea off Algeria (37°10′N 4°35′E) by an Italian Savoia-Marchetti SM.79 Sparviero bomber aircraft. Ten crew and one gunner were lost.
F 607	Kriegsmarine	World War II: The Type C2 Marinefahrprahm was bombed and sunk in the Strait of Messina. There were five wounded.
I-O-23	Kriegsmarine	World War II: The Siebelgefäß landing craft was scuttled near Catona, Reggio Calabria, Italy.
I-O-79	Kriegsmarine	World War II: The Siebelgefäß landing craft was scuttled near Catona, Reggio Calabria, Italy.
Maria Della Luce	Italy	World War II: The motor-sail boat (45 GRT) was damaged on 15 August during an air attack on Vibo Valentia, Italy. She sank the next day when the port was subject to more naval and air attacks.
R228 Santo Stefano	Regia Marina	World War II: The auxiliary minesweeper (26 GRT) was bombed and sunk off Bagnara Calabra, Italy. She was later raised.
SF 53	Kriegsmarine	World War II: The Siebel ferry was scuttled near Catona, Reggio Calabria, Italy.
SF 161	Kriegsmarine	World War II: The Siebel ferry was bombed and sunk in the Strait of Messina.
SF 165	Kriegsmarine	World War II: The Siebel ferry was scuttled at Catona, Calabria, Italy, due to engine trouble.
SF 173	Kriegsmarine	World War II: The Siebel ferry was scuttled at Catona, Calabria, Italy, due to engine trouble.
SF 175	Kriegsmarine	World War II: The Siebel ferry was damaged by aircraft in the Strait of Messina and in the evening was beached near San Giovanni, Calabria, Italy to avoid sinking but was a total loss.
SF 200	Kriegsmarine	World War II: The Siebel ferry was heavily damaged by aircraft in the Strait of Messina and was scuttled at Catona, Calabria, Italy.
SF 232	Kriegsmarine	World War II: The Siebel ferry was bombed and sunk in the Strait of Messina. There were three wounded.
T-105	Soviet Navy	The auxiliary minesweeper was lost on this date.
Z84 Lucia G	Regia Marina	The auxiliary harbor service ship (46 GRT) was lost in unknown circumstances near Milazzo, Sicily.

== 17 August ==
List of shipwrecks: 17 August 1943
Ship	State	Description
Empire Stanley	United Kingdom	World War II: The CAM ship (6,921 GRT, 1941) was torpedoed and sunk in the Indian Ocean south east of Cap Sainte Marie, Madagascar (27°08′S 48°15′E) by U-197 (Kriegsmarine) with the loss of 25 of her 54 crew. Survivors were rescued by Socotra (United Kingdom) and HMS Thyme (Royal Navy).
I-O-82	Kriegsmarine	World War II: The Siebelgefäß landing craft was heavily damaged by Allied fighter-bombers off Punta Pezzo, Calabria, Italy, and was scuttled by her crew.
I-O-99	Kriegsmarine	World War II: The Siebelgefäß landing craft was heavily damaged by Allied fighter-bombers near Scilla, Calabria, Italy, and was scuttled by her crew.
USS LCI(L)-1	United States Navy	World War II: The LCI-1-class landing craft infantry was bombed and sunk in Lac de Bizerte, Tunisia (37°13′N 09°51′E). All 26 crew were rescued.
Margrethe	Denmark	World War II: The fishing boat was sunk by an explosion, probably due to a mine, in Smaaland waters (54°53′N 11°33′E). Both crew were rescued.
MZ 711	Regia Marina	World War II: The Type A Marinefahrprahm was bombed and sunk by Allied aircraft at Marinella di Palmi, Calabria, Italy. She was raised by the Germans in September 1943 and resumed service as F 4711.
MZ 757	Regia Marina	World War II: The Type A Marinefahrprahm was bombed and sunk by Allied aircraft near Marinella di Palmi, Calabria, Italy.
MZ 772	Regia Marina	World War II: The Type A Marinefahrprahm was bombed and sunk by Allied aircraft near Bagnara Calabra, Calabria, Italy.
MZ 790	Regia Marina	World War II: The Type A Marinefahrprahm was torpedoed and sunk by Allied aircraft near Vibo Valentia, Calabria, Italy. There were no casualty.
PiLB 57	Kriegsmarine	World War II: The PiLB 39 Type personnel landing craft was sunk by an air attack off Scilla, Calabria, Italy. There were no casualty.
SF 162	Kriegsmarine	World War II: The Siebel ferry that had been beached near Scilla, Calabria, Italy sometimes during the month was scuttled.
StuBo 1083	Kriegsmarine	World War II: The StuBo42 type landing craft/motor launch was sunk by Allied aircraft near Nicotera, Calabria, Italy.

== 18 August ==
List of shipwrecks: 18 August 1943
Ship	State	Description
BK-123 Geroy Sovetskogo Soyuza Parshin and BK-133 Geroy Sovetskogo Soyuza Odintsov	Soviet Navy	World War II: The No. 16/Project 1125 armored motor gunboats were shelled and sunk in the Sea of Azov by MAL-1 and MAL-2 (both Kriegsmarine). Four crewmen were captured.
Cha-5	Imperial Japanese Navy	World War II: Battle off Horaniu: The submarine chaser was sunk in the Pacific Ocean off Vella Lavella by USS Chevalier, USS Nicholas, USS O'Bannon and USS Taylor (all United States Navy).
Cha-12	Imperial Japanese Navy	World War II: Battle off Horaniu: The submarine chaser was sunk in the Pacific Ocean off Vella Lavella by USS Chevalier, USS Nicholas, USS O'Bannon and USS Taylor (all United States Navy).
F 626	Kriegsmarine	The Type C Marinefahrprahm ran aground near Cannes, France and was a total loss.
J. Pinckney Henderson	United States	World War II: Convoy HX 252: The Liberty ship collided in the Atlantic Ocean with J. H. Senior (Panama) and caught fire. J. Pinckney Henderson was towed to Sydney, Nova Scotia, Canada where she was beached. The ship, which was on her maiden voyage was a total loss. J. H. Senior was towed to Bay Bulls, Newfoundland where she was also declared a total loss. There were three survivors from J. Pinckney Henderson and six from J. H. Senior.
HMS LCT 301	Royal Navy	World War II: The LCT 3-class landing craft tank (350/640 t, 1942) was lost when HMS LCT 416 (Royal Navy) exploded and sank at Tripoli, Libya.
HMS LCT 416	Royal Navy	World War II: The LCT 3-class landing craft tank (350/640 t, 1942) exploded and sank at Tripoli, Libya.
USS LST-396	United States Navy	The LST-1-class landing ship tank (1,625 GRT) was sunk by the accidental explosion of her cargo at New Georgia, Solomon Islands (08°18′S 156°55′E). The burning ship was evacuated and all 103 crew were rescued by USS Saufley and SC-1266 (both United States Navy) but one died from injuries suffered in the explosions.
P65 Antonietta	Regia Marina	World War II: The auxiliary patrol ship was bombed and sunk by Allied aircraft off Bagnara Calabra, Italy.
PMB-61	Soviet Navy	World War II: The motorboat was sunk by German aircraft in Motovka Bay.
SKA-222	Soviet Navy	World War II: The naval drifter/patrol ship was sunk by German aircraft in Motovka Bay.
U-403	Kriegsmarine	World War II: The Type VIIC submarine was depth charged and sunk in the Atlantic Ocean (13°42′N 17°36′W) by a Vickers Wellington aircraft of 344 Squadron, Royal Air Force with the loss of all 49 crew.
V256 Beatrice	Regia Marina	World War II: The auxiliary guard ship was bombed and sunk by Allied aircraft off Punta Malfatano, near Cagliari, Italy.

== 19 August ==
List of shipwrecks: 19 August 1943
Ship	State	Description
Amoy Maru	Japan	The cargo ship became stranded off Dalian, China (38°52′N 122°20′E) and was a total loss.
I-17	Imperial Japanese Navy	World War II: The B1 type submarine was sunk in the Pacific Ocean off Noumea by HMNZS Tui (Royal New Zealand Navy) and Vought OS2U Kingfisher aircraft of the United States Navy. 97 crew were killed. The 6 survivors were rescued by Tui.
I-O-87	Kriegsmarine	World War II: The Siebelgefäß landing craft was sunk by Royal Navy ships south of Salerno, Italy.
KSF 230	Kriegsmarine	World War II: The Siebel ferry was sunk by Royal Navy ships south of Salerno, Italy.
Minde IV	Denmark	World War II: The coaster was sunk by an explosion, probably due to a mine, in the Great Belt, Denmark. Two of the four crew were killed. The ship was later raised.
PiLB 212	Kriegsmarine	World War II: The PiLB 40 type landing craft was sunk by Royal Navy motor gun boats off Policastro, Italy.
PiLB 214	Kriegsmarine	World War II: The PiLB 40 type landing craft was sunk by Royal Navy motor gun boats off Policastro, Italy.
PiLB 216	Kriegsmarine	World War II: The PiLB 40 type landing craft was sunk by Royal Navy motor gun boats off Policastro, Italy.
PiLB 315	Kriegsmarine	World War II: The PiLB 40 type landing craft was sunk by Royal Navy motor gun boats off Policastro, Italy.
Santos	Norway	World War II: Convoy HX 252: The cargo ship (4,639 GRT, 1928) was in collision with J. H. Senior and Theodore Dwight Weld (both United States) in the Atlantic Ocean and sank with the loss of two of her 39 crew. Survivors were rescued by HMS Narcissus (Royal Navy).
SKA-211	Soviet Navy	World War II: The patrol ship was damaged by German aircraft in Motovka Bay the day before and was beached near Cape Sharapov. Five crew were killed. She was bombed and sunk by German aircraft.

== 20 August ==
List of shipwrecks: 20 August 1943
Ship	State	Description
Athelduchess	United Kingdom	The tanker ran aground in The Smalls, Cornwall and later broke in tow. All crew were rescued by lifeboats. She was declared a constructive total loss. The stern section was salvaged, a new bow section was constructed and she returned to service in December 1947.
Chosa Maru	Imperial Japanese Navy	World War II: The Fukken Maru-class auxiliary gunboat was torpedoed and sunk in the Malacca Strait (05°09′N 100°10′E) by HNLMS O 24 (Royal Netherlands Navy). Five crew were killed. On 23 May 2014 Hai Wei Gong 889 (Cambodia) was detained for illegally salvaging her wreck, with the wreck completely removed.
El Sayeda	Egypt	World War II: The sailing ship (68 GRT) was shelled and sunk in the Mediterranean Sea off the coast of Lebanon by U-596 (Kriegsmarine). The crew had left the sailing vessel before it was attacked and safely reached the coast.
Inari Maru	Japan	World War II: The sailing vessel was sunk by gunfire in the Pacific Ocean (45°50′N 148°22′E) by USS Wahoo (United States Navy). Six crew were captured.
Nikkyo Maru	Japan	The cargo ship ran aground near Kojima, Japan (34°14′N 136°39′E) and was wrecked.
R 84	Kriegsmarine	World War II: The Type R-41 minesweeper was machine gunned and sunk in the English Channel off Boulogne, Pas-de-Calais, France by British aircraft. The names of two crew who died in the sinking are known.
Seitai Maru	Japan	World War II: The cargo ship was torpedoed and sunk in the Sea of Okhotsk off the southwest coast of Hokkaido (42°15′N 139°58′E) by USS Plunger (United States Navy). One crew was killed.
Seizan Maru	Imperial Japanese Navy	World War II: The Seizan Maru-class auxiliary transport (955 GRT 1918) was torpedoed and sunk 5 nautical miles (9.3 km) south east of Tulloch Cape, Borneo (01°00′N 119°00′E) by USS Gar (United States Navy). 12 crewmen were killed.
U-197	Kriegsmarine	World War II: The Type IXD2 submarine was depth charged and sunk in the Indian Ocean south of Madagascar (28°40′S 42°36′E) by a Consolidated PBY Catalina aircraft of 265 Squadron, Royal Air Force with the loss of all 67 crew.
U-670	Kriegsmarine	The Type VIIC submarine collided in the Gulf of Danzig with Bolkoburg (Kriegsmarine) and sank with the loss of 22 of her 43 crew.
Varna	Bulgaria	World War II: The cargo ship was torpedoed and sunk by D-4 (Soviet Navy) west of Cape Tarkhankut (45°13′N 32°35′E). One source says all 32 crew died, another that 3 crew died.

== 21 August ==
List of shipwrecks: 21 August 1943
Ship	State	Description
Lily	Palestine	World War II: The sailing ship was shelled and sunk in the Mediterranean Sea 20 nautical miles (37 km) north north east of Beirut, Lebanon by U-596 (Kriegsmarine) with the loss of nine of her 11 crew.
Namaz	Egypt	World War II: The sailing ship was shelled and sunk in the Mediterranean Sea (33°42′N 34°43′E) by U-596 (Kriegsmarine). All crew survived.
Panikos	Egypt	World War II: The sailing ship was shelled and sunk in the Mediterranean Sea (33°42′N 34°43′E) by U-596 (Kriegsmarine). All crew survived.
PiLF 245	Kriegsmarine	World War II: The Siebel ferry was run aground near Policastro, Italy, after an air attack. She was scuttled by her crew two days later.

== 22 August ==
List of shipwrecks: 22 August 1943
Ship	State	Description
DB-36	Soviet Navy	World War II: The No. 1-class landing boat (16 GRT) was captured and scuttled with explosives in the Black Sea by U-24 (Kriegsmarine). All three crew were taken as prisoners of war.
DB-37	Soviet Navy	World War II: The No. 1-class landing boat (16 GRT) was captured and scuttled with explosives in the Black Sea by U-24 (Kriegsmarine). All three crew were taken as prisoners of war.
Derviske	Turkey	World War II: The schooner was stopped in the Black Sea by ShCh-209 (Soviet Navy) that captured the whole crew. She was left to drift without a crew and eventually sank.
Ginetto	Italy	World War II: The cargo ship (1,127 GRT) was bombed and sunk by Allied aircraft at Preveza, Greece. She was raised post-war.
Glasgow Maru	Imperial Japanese Army	World War II: The Daifuku Maru No. 1-class transport was sunk by a mine in the Gulf of Martaban, Indian Ocean off Rangoon, Burma (16°22′N 96°18′E). One passenger was killed.
Kaisho Maru	Imperial Japanese Navy	World War II: Convoy No. 4821: The Toyo Maru-class auxiliary transport (4,164 GRT 1938) was torpedoed and sunk in the Pacific Ocean 300 miles (480 km) northwest of Truk (10°13′N 147°20′E) by USS Tullibee (United States Navy). Three crewmen were killed.
Nishiyama Maru	Japan	World War II: The cargo ship (a.k.a. Seizan Maru) was torpedoed and sunk in the Pacific Ocean (02°55′N 136°43′E) by USS Swordfish (United States Navy). Three passengers and four crew were killed.
Orion	Germany	World War II: The coaster was sunk at Piraeus, Greece by saboteurs. She was later raised, repaired and returned to service.
Ryokai Maru	Imperial Japanese Army	World War II: The Ryokai Maru-class auxiliary transport was torpedoed and sunk in the Sea of Japan (43°24′N 140°26′E) by USS Plunger (United States Navy).
U-458	Kriegsmarine	World War II: The Type VIIC submarine (757/857 t, 1941) was depth charged and sunk in the Mediterranean Sea south east of Pantelleria, Italy (36°25′N 12°39′E) by HMS Easton (Royal Navy) and Pindos (Hellenic Navy) with the loss of eight of her 47 crew.

== 23 August ==
List of shipwrecks: 23 August 1943
Ship	State	Description
Ataka Maru	Japan	World War II: The government-chartered cargo liner was torpedoed and sunk in the Pacific Ocean off Hamamatsu, Japan (34°36′N 138°50′E) by USS Paddle (United States Navy). One of her Italian crew was killed, and another wounded. The 30 or 31 survivors were rescued by fishing boats.
USS Crow	United States Navy	The coastal minesweeper was torpedoed and sunk in error in Puget Sound by United States Navy aircraft whilst acting as a target towing ship and practice torpedo retrieval vessel. The whole crew was rescued.
Heito Maru	Imperial Japanese Navy	World War II: The Heito Maru-class auxiliary transport was bombed and sunk 1 mile (1.6 km) east of Car Nicobar Island by Consolidated B-24 Liberator aircraft of the 7th Bomb Group, 10th Air Force. Four troops and 29 crew were killed (another source says 29 crew and 18 gunners were killed).
L-2109	Kriegsmarine	World War II: The lighter was sunk by mines in the Sea of Azov south west of Taganrog with the loss of two lives.
M 5209 Carl Stangen	Kriegsmarine	The minesweeper ran aground in Kongsfjord, Norway. Declared a total loss on 27 August, the wreck was abandoned and was later torpedoed by a Royal Navy motor torpedo boat on 2 September.
Riilahti	Finnish Navy	World War II: Continuation War: The Ruotsinsalmi-class minelayer was torpedoed and sunk off Tiiskeri, Gulf of Finland by TK-94 (Soviet Navy). 23 crew were killed, and 11 were rescued, including her captain who died of his wounds later.
USS SC-694	United States Navy	World War II: The SC-497-class submarine chaser was bombed and sunk in the Mediterranean Sea in Palermo, Sicily, Italy by Junkers Ju 88 aircraft of the Luftwaffe. Four crew were killed and 19 wounded.
USS SC-696	United States Navy	World War II: The SC-497-class submarine chaser was bombed and sunk in the Mediterranean Sea in Palermo by Junkers Ju 88 aircraft of the Luftwaffe. 20 crew were killed and 4 wounded.

== 24 August ==
List of shipwrecks: 24 August 1943
Ship	State	Description
Erg	Canada	The tug was scuttled after being declared a constructive total loss after a collision on 6 July 1943.
Hinode Maru No. 8 GO	Imperial Japanese Navy	The auxiliary guard ship was lost on this date.
SG 14	Kriegsmarine	World War II: The escort ship was bombed and sunk in the Mediterranean Sea south of Capri, Italy by Royal Air Force aircraft. Eight crew were killed.
Shkval	Soviet Navy	World War II: The minesweeper was shelled and sunk in the Black Sea off Cape Kodor by U-23 (Kriegsmarine) with the loss of three of her ten crew. One of the survivors died of wounds.
U-185	Kriegsmarine	U-185 World War II: The Type IXC/40 submarine was sunk in the Atlantic Ocean (27°00′N 37°06′W) by Grumman TBF Avenger and Grumman F4F Wildcat aircraft based on USS Core (United States Navy) with the loss of 29 of her 56 crew and of 14 of the 23 survivors from U-604 (Kriegsmarine) aboard. The survivors were rescued by USS Barker (United States Navy).

== 25 August ==
List of shipwrecks: 25 August 1943
Ship	State	Description
ASO-1 Shkval	Soviet Navy	World War II: The rescue tug struck a mine laid by U-625 (Kriegsmarine) and sank in the Yugor Strait. There were 47 dead and only 5 survivors.
Giovannina Bella	Italy	World War II: The schooner (33 GRT) took fire for an unknown reason in the port of Krioneri, near Patras, Greece, and was sunk by gunfire when the fire went out of control.
Hermon	Sweden	World War II: The fishing boat was sunk by gunfire from M 426 (Kriegsmarine) north of Hanstholm, Denmark with the loss of all six crew.
I-25	Imperial Japanese Navy	World War II: The Type B submarine was sunk off the New Hebrides Islands (13°10′S 165°27′E) by USS Patterson (United States Navy) with all 100 hands.
Ro-35	Imperial Japanese Navy	World War II: The Kaichū VII type submarine was depth charged and sunk in the Coral Sea (12°57′S 164°23′E) by USS Ellet (United States Navy) with all 66 hands.
Shojiro Maru	Japan	World War II: The sailing vessel was boarded in the Molucca Sea (0°32′N 125°18′E) by USS Trout(United States Navy) and sunk by demolition charges and gunfire after the crew had been taken off.
Siqueira Campos	Brazil	The passenger ship collided with Cuyabá (Brazil) off Caponga. She was beached but was declared a constructive total loss. There was no casualty.
U-523	Kriegsmarine	World War II: The Type IXC submarine was depth charged and sunk in the Bay of Biscay by HMS Wanderer and HMS Wallflower (both Royal Navy) with the loss of 17 of her 54 crew.
Vestkusten	Sweden	World War II: The fishing boat was sunk by gunfire from M 470 (Kriegsmarine) north of Hanstholm, Denmark with the loss of all six crew.
Yilmaz	Turkey	World War II: The schooner was captured in the Black Sea by ShCh-209 (Soviet Navy) and was left to sink.

== 26 August ==
List of shipwrecks: 26 August 1943
Ship	State	Description
Christian Michelsen	Norway	World War II: Convoy UGS 14: The Liberty ship was torpedoed and sunk in the Mediterranean Sea 30 nautical miles (56 km) east of Bône, Algeria (37°12′N 8°26′E) by U-410 (Kriegsmarine) with the loss of 47 of her 50 crew. Survivors were rescued by one of the convoy's escorts. (Look 26/09/1943)
John Bell	United States	World War II: Convoy UGS 14: The Liberty ship was torpedoed and sunk in the Mediterranean Sea off La Calle, Algeria (37°15′N 8°24′E) by U-410 (Kriegsmarine) with the loss of one of her 72 crew. Survivors were rescued by HMS BYMS-23 (Royal Navy) and HMSAS Southern Maid (South African Navy).
Richard Henderson	United States	World War II: Convoy UGS 14: The Liberty ship was torpedoed and sunk in the Mediterranean Sea off Sardinia, Italy (37°15′N 8°24′E) by U-410 (Kriegsmarine). All 70 crew were rescued by HMSAS Southern Maid (South African Navy) or reached land in their lifeboats.
ShCh-203	Soviet Navy	World War II: The Shchuka-class submarine was torpedoed and sunk in the Black Sea west of Yevpatoriya, Crimea (45°12′N 32°47′E) by SB 4 (Regia Marina) with all 45 hands.
StuBo 1001	Kriegsmarine	World War II: The StuBo42 type landing craft/motor launch was sunk by Soviet aircraft at Temryuk, Russia. Two soldiers were wounded. She was later raised but not repaired.

== 27 August ==
List of shipwrecks: 27 August 1943
Ship	State	Description
Città di Spezia	Italy	World War II: The cargo ship (2,474 GRT) was torpedoed and sunk in the Mediterranean Sea off Brindisi, Italy (40°36′N 18°37′E) by HMS Unruffled (Royal Navy). There were 119 survivors, four of which 4 were captured by the submarine. 7 merchant sailors, a civilian passenger and 23 soldiers were killed.
Daifuku Maru No. 1	Imperial Japanese Army	World War II: Convoy FU-806: The Daifuku Maru No. 1-class auxiliary transport (a.k.a. Taifuku Maru) (5,869 GRT) was torpedoed and sunk in the Pacific Ocean off Kyushu (32°28′N 132°23′E) by USS Pollack (United States Navy). 14 passengers were killed. The 192 survivors were rescued by W-17 (Imperial Japanese Navy).
HMS Egret	Royal Navy	World War II: The Egret-class sloop (1,250/1,790 t, 1938) was bombed and sunk in the Atlantic Ocean off the coast of Portugal (42°10′N 9°22′W) by Dornier Do 217 aircraft of the Luftwaffe carrying Henschel Hs 293 glider bombs. A total of 198 people were lost, 194 crew and four RAF electronic surveillance technicians. There were 35 survivors.
Havbris I	Norway	World War II: The fishing vessel was sunk with gunfire by HMS Untiring (Royal Navy) in the Norwegian Sea off Bodø after her seven crew were taken onboard the submarine.
USS LCT-319	United States Navy	The LCT-1-class landing craft tank ran aground and sank in the harbor at Kiska in the Aleutian Islands during a storm.
Meizan Maru	Japan	World War II: The cargo liner was torpedoed and sunk in the Tablas Strait north east of Mindoro, Philippines (13°13′N 121°23′E) by USS Grayling (United States Navy). Four crew were killed.
Rastrello	Italy	World War II: The cargo ship (985 GRT) was torpedoed and sunk in the Mediterranean Sea 48 nautical miles (89 km) off Brindisi by HMS Unseen (Royal Navy). Four crew were killed and 12 survived.
StuBo 1091	Kriegsmarine	The StuBo42 type landing craft/motor launch ran aground north of Naples and was destroyed by explosives two days later.
TKA-15	Soviet Navy	World War II: The G-5-class motor torpedo boat was sunk by an explosion, probably due to a mine, off Malyi Utrish.
Tokai Maru	Imperial Japanese Navy	World War II: The recently raised Kenai Maru-class auxiliary transport ship (8,359 GRT, 1933) was torpedoed and sunk again in Apra Harbour, Guam by USS Snapper (United States Navy). There were no casualties.
U-134	Kriegsmarine	World War II: The Type VIIC submarine (1,070 GRT) was depth charged and sunk in the Bay of Biscaynorth of Cape Ortegal (44°03′N 8°05′W) by HMS Rother (Royal Navy) with the loss of all 48 crew.
U-847	Kriegsmarine	World War II: The Type IXD2 submarine (2,150 GRT) was sunk in the Sargasso Sea (28°19′N 37°58′W) by Grumman TBM Avenger and Grumman F4F Wildcat aircraft based on USS Card (United States Navy) with the loss of all 62 crew.
Xenia	Denmark	World War II: The coaster (141 GRT) was sunk by an explosion, probably due to a mine, in the Drogden channel with all five hands.

== 28 August ==
List of shipwrecks: 28 August 1943
Ship	State	Description
B387 Marisa	Regia Marina	World War II: The auxiliary minesweeper (24 GRT) was bombed and sunk by Allied aircraft in the Mar Piccolo of Taranto, Italy.
B423 Impero	Regia Marina	World War II: The auxiliary minesweeper (22 GRT) was bombed and sunk in the Mar Piccolo of Taranto, Italy. She was later raised.
Dikson	Soviet Union	World War II: The cargo ship was torpedoed and sunk in the Kara Sea (75°43′N 89°38′E) by U-302 (Kriegsmarine). All 63 crew were rescued by the tug Severoles No. 18 (Soviet Union).
Fabiola	Regia Marina	World War II: The auxiliary patrol boat (103 GRT) was sunk with gunfire and scuttling charges off Saseno Island, Albania, by HMS Unseen (Royal Navy). All 17 crew survived, two being captured by the submarine.
Hainburg	Germany	World War II: The tug was torpedoed in the Black Sea off Cape Lukull, Crimea (44°47′N 33°26′E) by M-111 (Soviet Navy). The bow was torn off and four crew were missing. She was towed to Braila and later repaired and returned to service.
Lince	Regia Marina	World War II: The Spica-class torpedo boat had run aground on 4 August near the town of Cirò Marina, in the Gulf of Taranto, and was still stranded there despite several attempts. She was torpedoed and sunk by HMS Ultor (Royal Navy). 9 crew and a young boy on a fishing boat nearby were killed, and another crew died of wounds.
SG 10	Kriegsmarine	World War II: The auxiliary escort ship was torpedoed and sunk in the Mediterranean Sea off Corsica 42°26′N 9°50′E) by HMS Sickle (Royal Navy) with the loss of 85 crew.
U-639	Kriegsmarine	World War II: The Type VIIC submarine was torpedoed and sunk in the Kara Sea (76°49′N 69°42′E) by S-101 (Soviet Navy) with the loss of all 47 crew.
Z91 Salvatore	Regia Marina	World War II: The auxiliary harbor service ship (43 GRT) was bombed and sunk by Allied aircraft at Taranto, Italy.

== 29 August ==
List of shipwrecks: 29 August 1943
Ship	State	Description
Arabia II	United Kingdom	The coal hulk was wrecked on this date.
HDMS Bellona	Royal Danish Navy	World War II: Operation Safari: The Rota-class submarine was scuttled at Holmen Naval Base in Copenhagen to prevent capture by the Germans.
Chojun Maru	Japan	The cargo ship was sunk in a collision with Kokuryu Maru (Japan) off Pusan, Korea (34°28′N 128°55′E). 17 crew were killed.
HDMS Dampbåd A	Royal Danish Navy	World War II: Operation Safari: The auxiliary was scuttled off Tåsinge to prevent capture by the Germans.
HDMS Daphne	Royal Danish Navy	World War II: Operation Safari: The Daphne-class submarine was scuttled at Holmen Naval Base in Copenhagen to prevent capture by the Germans.
HDMS Dryaden	Royal Danish Navy	World War II: Operation Safari: The Daphne-class submarine was scuttled at Holmen Naval Base in Copenhagen to prevent capture by the Germans.
HDMS Flora	Royal Danish Navy	World War II: Operation Safari: The Rota-class submarine was scuttled at Holmen Naval Base in Copenhagen to prevent capture by the Germans.
HDMS Havfruen	Royal Danish Navy	World War II: Operation Safari: The Havmanden-class submarine was scuttled at Holmen Naval Base in Copenhagen to prevent capture by the Germans. Raised, repaired and returned to service 1946.
HDMS Havhesten	Royal Danish Navy	World War II: Operation Safari: The Havmanden-class submarine was scuttled at Holmen Naval Base in Copenhagen to prevent capture by the Germans. Raised, repaired and returned to service 1946.
HDMS Havkalen	Royal Danish Navy	World War II: Operation Safari: The Havmanden-class submarine was scuttled at Holmen Naval Base in Copenhagen to prevent capture by the Germans. Raised, repaired and returned to service 1946.
HDMS Havmanden	Royal Danish Navy	World War II: Operation Safari: The Havmanden-class submarine was scuttled at Holmen Naval Base in Copenhagen to prevent capture by the Germans. Raised, repaired and returned to service 1946.
HDMS Havørnen	Royal Danish Navy	World War II: Operation Safari: The Springeren-class torpedo boat tried to escape to Sweden to prevent capture by the Germans but was intercepted by a German warship and was scuttled by sailing at full speed into the Stammenakke reef. There were no casualty.
HDMS Hejmdal	Royal Danish Navy	World War II: Operation Safari: The survey ship was scuttled at Holmen Naval Base in Copenhagen to prevent capture by the Germans. She was raised, repaired and put in service as Nerger (Kriegsmarine).
HDMS Henrik Gerner	Royal Danish Navy	World War II: Operation Safari: The Henrik Gerner-class submarine depot ship/minelayer was scuttled at Holmen Naval Base in Copenhagen to prevent capture by the Germans. She was raised, repaired and put in service as Prenzlau (Kriegsmarine).
HDMS Hvalrossen	Royal Danish Navy	World War II: Operation Safari: The patrol boat, a former Hvalrossen-class torpedo boat, was scuttled at Holmen Naval Base in Copenhagen to prevent capture by the Germans. During an attempt to salvage by the Germans her keel broke and the effort was abandoned.
HDMS Hvidbjørnen	Royal Danish Navy	World War II: Operation Safari: The offshore patrol vessel was scuttled in the Great Belt to prevent capture by the Germans. She was later salvaged by the Germans and used as a patrol boat.
HDMS Kvintus	Royal Danish Navy	World War II: Operation Safari: The minelayer was scuttled at Holmen Naval Base in Copenhagen to prevent capture by the Germans. She was raised and repaired by the Germans.
HMS LCA (HR) 446	Royal Navy	The landing craft assault (9/12 t, 1942) had been recently modified as a LCA (HR) by the setting of a Hedgerow rocket launching system, but it has been done in an improvised way and the craft was not specially strengthened as it should be. During the first trial in Bizerta Bay the shock of firing damaged the craft that took so much water she quickly sank off Bizerta. There was no casualty.
HDMS Laaland	Royal Danish Navy	World War II: Operation Safari: The Lougen-class minelayer was scuttled at Holmen Naval Base in Copenhagen to prevent capture by the Germans. She was raised by the Germans, repaired and returned to Danish service in May 1945.
HDMS Lindormen	Royal Danish Navy	World War II: Operation Safari: The Lindormen-class minelayer was scuttled at Holmen Naval Base in Copenhagen to prevent capture by the Germans. She was later raised, repaired and put in service as VS 1401 (Kriegsmarine).
HDMS Lossen	Royal Danish Navy	World War II: Operation Safari: The minelayer was scuttled at Holmen Naval Base in Copenhagen to prevent capture by the Germans. She was raised, repaired and put in Kriegsmarine service.
HDMS Lougen	Royal Danish Navy	Lougen World War II: Operation Safari: The Lougen-class minelayer was scuttled at Holmen Naval Base in Copenhagen to prevent capture by the Germans. She was raised by the Germans, repaired and returned to Danish service in May 1945.
HDMS Makrelen	Royal Danish Navy	World War II: Operation Safari: The Springeren-class torpedo boat was scuttled at Holmen Naval Base in Copenhagen to prevent capture by the Germans.
Merci	Denmark	World War II: The fishing boat was sunk by an explosion, probably due to a mine, in the North Sea west of Esbjerg, Denmark. All four crew were rescued.
HDMS MS 4	Royal Danish Navy	MS 4 on fire World War II: Operation Safari: The MS 1-class minesweeper was scuttled at Holmen Naval Base in Copenhagen to prevent capture by the Germans.
HDMS MS 8	Royal Danish Navy	World War II: Operation Safari: The minesweeper was scuttled at Holmen Naval Base in Copenhagen to prevent capture by the Germans. She was raised by the Germans and returned to Danish service post-war.
HDMS MS 10	Royal Danish Navy	World War II: Operation Safari: The minesweeper was scuttled at Holmen Naval Base in Copenhagen to prevent capture by the Germans. She was raised by the Germans and returned to Danish service post-war.
HDMS Niels Juel	Royal Danish Navy	Niels Juel under attack by German bombers World War II: Operation Safari: Battle of Isefjord: The coastal defence ship was run aground after being damaged by German bombing in the Isefjord while trying to reach Sweden. Five crew were wounded, one fatally. Salvaged in October 1943 and put into German service as Nordland.
HDMS Nordkaperen	Royal Danish Navy	World War II: Operation Safari: The Springeren-class torpedo boat was scuttled at Holmen Naval Base in Copenhagen to prevent capture by the Germans.
HDMS Peder Skram	Royal Danish Navy	Peder Skram World War II: Operation Safari: The coastal defence ship was scuttled at Holmen Naval Base in Copenhagen to prevent capture by the Germans. Later salvaged by the Germans and returned to service as the Adler (Kriegsmarine).
HDMS Rota	Royal Danish Navy	World War II: Operation Safari: The Rota-class submarine was scuttled at Holmen Naval Base in Copenhagen to prevent capture by the Germans.
HDMS Sælen	Royal Danish Navy	Sælen and Nordkaperen World War II: Operation Safari: The Springeren-class torpedo boat was scuttled at Holmen Naval Base in Copenhagen to prevent capture by the Germans.
HDMS Sixtus	Royal Danish Navy	World War II: Operation Safari: The minelayer was scuttled at Holmen Naval Base in Copenhagen to prevent capture by the Germans.She was raised and repaired by the Germans.
HDMS Søbjørnen	Royal Danish Navy	Søbjørnen World War II: Operation Safari: The Søløven-class minesweeper was scuttled at Holmen Naval Base in Copenhagen to prevent capture by the Germans. She was raised by the Germans but broke during the attempt and was not returned to service.
HDMS Søhunden	Royal Danish Navy	World War II: Operation Safari: The Søløven-class minesweeper was scuttled at Holmen Naval Base in Copenhagen to prevent capture by the Germans. She was later raised, repaired and put in service as MA 6 (Kriegsmarine).
HDMS Soulven	Royal Danish Navy	World War II: Operation Safari: The Søløven-class minesweeper was scuttled at Holmen Naval Base in Copenhagen to prevent capture by the Germans. She was salvaged by the Germans but not returned to service.
TShCh-11 Dzhalita	Soviet Union	World War II: The trawler was torpedoed and sunk in the Black Sea off Poti by U-18 (Kriegsmarine) with the loss of fifteen of her 38 crew. Survivors were rescued by SKA-0108 (Soviet Navy).

== 30 August ==
List of shipwrecks: 30 August 1943
Ship	State	Description
BK-122	Soviet Navy	World War II: The Type 1124 gunboat was shelled and sunk in the Bay of Taganrod by MAL-1 (Kriegsmarine).
BK-312	Soviet Navy	World War II: The Type 1125 gunboat was shelled and sunk in the Bay of Taganrod by MAL-1 (Kriegsmarine).
KM-605	Soviet Navy	World War II: The KM-class minesweeper was sunk in Kronstadt Channel by German Army motor boats. Three crewmen were killed and six were rescued.
Nagwa	Egypt	World War II: The sailing ship was shelled and sunk in the Mediterranean Sea south of Cyprus (34°40′N 33°20′E) by U-596 (Kriegsmarine). All ten crew survived.
Taibun Maru	Japan	World War II: The cargo ship was torpedoed and sunk in the Pacific Ocean off Cape Choshi, two kilometres (1.2 mi) north west of the Koshida Peninsula (41°52′N 141°11′E) by USS Halibut (United States Navy). Five people were killed.
Thisbé	Germany	World War II: The cargo ship was torpedoed and sunk in the Black Sea off Istanbul, Turkey by Shch-215 (Soviet Navy). According to one source all 39 crew were rescued but another tells all 40 crew were killed and the names of 6 German men (2 sailors and 4 Flak gunners) who died aboard this ship on this day are known.
U-634	Kriegsmarine	World War II: The Type VIIC submarine was depth charged and sunk in the Atlantic Ocean east of the Azores, Portugal (40°13′N 19°24′W) by HMS Stonecrop and HMS Stork (both Royal Navy) with the loss of all 47 crew.

== 31 August ==
List of shipwrecks: 31 August 1943
Ship	State	Description
Alpha II	Denmark	World War II: The fishing boat was sunk by an explosion, probably due to a mine, in the Baltic Sea (54°43′N 12°40′E). Two crew were killed.
Columbo	Italy	World War II: The sailing vessel was sunk by gunfire in the Aegean Sea west of Kos by HMS Torbay (Royal Navy). There were no casualties.
Flegetone	Italy	World War II: The tanker was torpedoed and sunk in the Mediterranean Sea by HMS Unsparing (Royal Navy). There were 18 dead and 40 survivors.
Kokko Maru	Japan	World War II: The Type 1K Standard merchant ore carrier was torpedoed and sunk in the East China Sea (28°30′N 123°06′E) by USS Seawolf (United States Navy) with the loss of twenty crewmen.
USS LCT-154	United States Navy	World War II: The LCT Mk 5-class landing craft tank was lost in the Gulf of Tunis (37°08′N 10°58′E).
Shch-130	Soviet Navy	The Shchuka-class submarine collided with Shch-128 (Soviet Navy) and sank to the bottom of Golden Horn Bay off Vladivostok. She was raised on 3 September, repaired and returned to service. Two crew died of carbon monoxide poisoning before the submarine was raised.
Shoto Maru	Japan	World War II: Convoy No. 297: The cargo ship was torpedoed and sunk in the Luzon Strait (28°30′N 123°06′E) by USS Seawolf (United States Navy). One crewman was killed.

== Unknown date ==
List of shipwrecks: Unknown date 1943
Ship	State	Description
Cha-109	Imperial Japanese Navy	World War II: The Ardjoeno-class submarine chaser was either sunk by aircraft off Balikpapan on 14 August or sunk on 19 August, either by an aircraft or torpedoed and sunk off the east coast of Celebes (03°01′S 125°50′E) by USS Finback (United States Navy).
Herakles	Germany	World War II: The cargo ship was damaged at Turku, Finland in an air raid. She was repaired in May 1945 and returned to service.
K-2	Soviet Navy	World War II: The K-class submarine left her base on 26 August and was not heard from again.
HMS LCP(L) 126	Royal Navy	The landing craft personnel (large) (6/8 t, 1941) was lost sometime in August.
HMS Parthian	Royal Navy	World War II: The Parthian-class submarine (1,760/2,040 t, 1931) was lost in the Adriatic Sea between 6 and 11 August with the loss of all 65 crew. She may have struck a mine off Brindisi, Italy.
S-9	Soviet Navy	World War II: The S-class submarine either struck a mine and sank in the Baltic Sea off Vaindloo, Estonia; or was torpedoed and sunk by Uisko (Finnish Navy) between 9 and 12 August. She was lost with all 46 hands.
U-669	Kriegsmarine	World War II: The Type VIIC submarine disappeared on patrol in the Bay of Biscay with the loss of all 52 crew. It was last reported on 30 August before doing a deep dive trial.
