= Battle of Nicotera =

Naval battle in 1282

- Part of the War of the Sicilian Vespers
Location	Nicotera, Kingdom of Sicily
Result	Aragonese–Sicilian victory

Belligerents
Crown of Aragon; Kingdom of Sicily	Kingdom of Naples

Commanders and leaders
Crown of Aragon: James of Aragon; Pedro de Queralt; Ramon de Cortada	Angevin Naples: (Republic of Genoa) Arrighino de’ Mari

Strength
15–22 galleys	48 ships

Casualties and losses
Light	Heavy; around 20 Angevin ships captured Many crews and embarked troops captured (contemporary chronicles list between 4,000 and 6,000 prisoners—though numbers this high are likely an exaggeration)

The Battle of Nicotera was a 13th-century naval engagement, fought between an Aragonese–Sicilian fleet and the Angevin Kingdom of Naples during the War of the Sicilian Vespers. Fought along the coastline of Southern Italy, most notably off of the town of Nicotera, the battle resulted in an Aragonese-Sicilian victory.

The battle took place in the aftermath of a failed attempt by an Angevin army to besiege the Sicilian city of Messina. The failure of the siege of Messina attritted the strength of the Angevin fleet operating off of Sicily, and the collapse of the siege forced the Angevins to put the fleet into port for repairs. When the Angevin fleet attempted to disperse to its home ports for the winter, it was intercepted and defeated by the Aragonese–Sicilian fleet.

Nicotera was the first direct battle between Angevin and Aragonese forces during the Vesperan conflict. While both fleets suffered from low preparedness and organizational issues, the Aragonese victory at Nicotera set the trend of Aragonese naval supremacy that would mark much of the rest of the War of the Sicilian Vespers.

== Background ==
In the spring of 1282, the island of Sicily rebelled against the rule of the Charles I of Anjou, king of the Angevin Kingdom of Naples, who had controlled the island since 1266. Starting in Palermo, the rebellion spread across Sicily, resulting in a major threat to Angevin rule over Sicily. Eager to crush the revolt, in June Charles amassed an army of 31,000 men in Catona, from where the army could make a crossing of the straits of Messina into Sicily. The Angevin army made a successful crossing of the strait in early July and began a protracted siege of Messina. Supporting the siege was a large Angevin fleet made up of ships levied from Charles' lands in Southern France, Italy, and Greece. These ships were supplemented by mercenary ships from the Italian city-states of Genoa, Pisa, and Venice.

While Charles and the Angevin army laid siege to Messina, the Sicilian rebels maneuvered politically; a Sicilian parliament was convened to represent the individual Sicilian cities, while envoys were sent to various foreign leaders and the papacy. The parliament came to the conclusion that Sicily lacked the resources to fight Angevin Naples by itself, and so sought out a foreign protector against the Angevins. In June, the Sicilian parliament contacted Peter II of Aragon, who had a claim to the now-vacant throne of Sicily by way of his wife, Constance of Sicily. Peter accepted the Sicilian offer, arriving in Sicily in late August an army. A relief force of Aragonese and Sicilian soldiers was dispatched to Messina, where it reinforced the city against the Angevin siege. Peter's intervention in the Sicilian conflict also brought Aragon's powerful navy into Sicilian waters, where it posed a serious threat to the Angevin fleet supporting the siege of Messina.

Facing the new Aragonese threat, Charles of Anjou chose to lift the siege of Messina in mid-September, wary of being cut off from his power base in Calabria by the newly arrived Aragonese navy. Charles conducted a costly-but-ultimately successful Angevin withdraw back across the strait of Messina in September 1282, and by October no Angevin forces remained on Sicily. However, the evacuation took a toll on the Angevin navy; numerous small watercraft had been lost during the siege of Messina, and many of the Angevin ships needed to be repaired after months of military use. Charles' naval commander, Genoese admiral Arrighino de' Mari, was cautious about facing the Aragonese navy in combat with his motely collection of galleys, transports, and converted merchant ships, and so advised Charles to have the Angevin fleet put in to the port town of Reggio for refit.

Despite the relative safety of Reggio, many of the Angevin and mercenary captains feared being blockaded in the port by the Aragonese. In addition, many captains hoped to return their ships to their home ports before the onset of winter. Tensions arose in the fleet, most notably between Genoese and Pisan mercenary captains, as service contracts expired. Such tensions, coupled with disease and generally poor morale, led to high rates of desertion in the fleet; by October, many of the ships in the fleet were badly undermanned.

While the Angevin fleet lay moored in Reggio, the Aragonese fleet stationed itself in Messina, where it joined 15 Sicilian galleys. Under the command of Peter of Aragon's second son, James of Aragon, the Aragonse-Sicilian fleet remained in Messina, cautiously observing the Angevin fleet in Reggio. Like the Angevin fleet, the allied fleet faced logistical and organizational challenges, as the Aragonese fleet had only arrived in Sicily the month before and had yet to fully incorporate the Sicilian fleet into its ranks.

== Battle ==
=== Opening moves ===
On 10 October, the Angevin fleet departed its anchorage at Reggio and sailed north along the Italian coast. Containing 72 ships, the fleet hoped to dash through the strait of Messina, evade the Aragonese fleet guarding the straits, and break out north into the Tyrrhenian Sea.

As the Angevins sailed north, the Aragonese fleet guarding the straits was initially disorganized; however, a force of 15 Aragonese galleys was able to scramble to block the strait. Faced with an unexpectedly aggressive Aragonese defense, on 11 October the Angevin fleet withdrew back to Reggio. The Aragonese attempted to pursue, but were faced with an unfavorable wind and so also returned to port.

Despite the bloodless victory, the Angevin attempt to force the strait, and the disorganized Aragonese response, worried Peter of Aragon. He ordered additional patrols around Messina and had James put more aggressive captains in command. The Angevin retreat also convinced Peter that Angevin morale was low and that the Angevin fleet was not interested in a fight.

=== Battle ===
On 14 October, weather conditions resulted in a dark and stormy morning; seeing this as an opportunity, a force of 48 Angevin ships sailed from Reggio and attempted a second running of the strait. The poor weather initially prevented the Aragonese from noticing this movement; when they did, the Aragonese-Sicilian fleet sailed in pursuit. Officially under the command of Prince James of Aragon, the Aragonese force was being personally led by two Aragonese captains, Pedro de Queralt and Ramon de Cortada.

Having advanced up the coast under the cover of the storm, the Angevin fleet initially had a lead over the pursuing Aragonese and Sicilian galleys. Both fleets passed through the Strait of Messina, with the Angevins being around 3 leagues ahead of the Aragonese. However, the Angevin fleet gradually began to lose cohesion as it sailed north - ships from individual Italian cities remained grouped together in formations that were unable - and oftentimes unwilling - to support those from other cities. After a pursuit of 48 kilometers, the Angevin fleet turned to face the Aragonese off the coast of the town of Nicotera. Nominally under de Mari's command, the Angevin fleet remained in disorder and was unable to form a solid battleline, while the Aragonese (under the command of Queralt and Cortada) advanced as a disciplined unit.

The oncoming Aragonese-Sicilian fleet grouped its ships together into a tight line bound with chains, and crashed into the Pisan contingent of the Angevin fleet, breaking through the center of the Angevin line. Seeing the center break, the Genoese and Provençal contingents of the Angevin fleet turned and fled, while the Neapolitan ships beached themselves at Nicotera. The remaining Angevin ships lost all cohesion and either fled, were captured, or were forced to fight in small groups against the better organized Aragonese. The poor condition and heavily depleted crews of the Angevin ships led to the Aragonese taking ships with relative ease; de Mari's flagship was captured in a boarding action, and was found to have only 18 crewmen left on board.

== Aftermath ==
The battle was a defeat for the Angevins and a victory for the Aragonese-Sicilian kingdom. The victorious Aragonese captured over twenty Angevin ships, towing them to Messina. Many of the ships captured were being used as troop transports, and so were filled with disheartened Angevin soldiers; several hundred prisoners were captured, with some contemporary chronicles listing four to six thousand prisoners taken.

The Angevin fleet scattered after the battle. Some ships staggered back to Reggio, while other individual ships were able to disperse and make it back to their home ports in the Tyrrhenian Sea. The victory gave the Aragonese fleet temporary control of the seas around Sicily, and this control allowed Aragon to go on the offensive against the Angevins in Calabria the following year.

The poor performance of the Angevin fleet led to Charles of Anjou attempting a major shakeup of the Angevin navy; this resulted in the appointment of more aggressive captains and a reduced reliance on mercenary ships. In a similar vein, Peter of Aragon also initiated reforms to remove ineffective captains, a policy that led to the sidelining of his son, Prince James.

Charles of Anjou’s push for a more aggressive naval strategy led to an Angevin attempt to capture Malta in 1283, where the Angevin navy suffered a crippling defeat at the Battle of Malta.
