= Siege of Messina (1282) =

Siege of the Sicilian city of Naples during the War of the Sicilian Vespers

- Part of the War of the Sicilian Vespers
| Location | Messina, Kingdom of Sicily |
| Result | Messinese–Aragonese–Sicilian victory |

Belligerents
| Crown of Aragon; Kingdom of Sicily; Commune of Messina | Kingdom of Naples; Supported by: Papal States |

Commanders and leaders
| Commune of Messina (Kingdom of Sicily) Alaimo da Lentini (Kingdom of Sicily) Baldwin Mussone (Kingdom of Sicily) Bartolomeo Maniscalco; Crown of Aragon: Peter III of Aragon; Niccola di Palizzi; Andrea da Procida | Angevin Naples: Charles of Anjou; Henri di Girard; Hugh of Brienne; Papal States: Gerardo da Parma |

Strength
| 8,000 men (Messinese garrison); 2,500 men (Aragonese reinforcements); 30 galleys | 23,000 infantry 8,000 cavalry 82 ships Numerous small watercraft |

Casualties and losses
| Heavy; Over 1,000 militia men lost at Milazzo, several hundred killed during Angevin assaults, hundreds lost to disease. | Heavy; 3,000 men claimed killed in battle, hundreds to disease, 100 watercraft and ships claimed burned. |

The siege of Messina (June–September 1282) was a 13th-century military engagement. Fought during the opening months of the War of the Sicilian Vespers, the engagement began when an Angevin army led by Charles of Anjou laid siege to the city of Messina, which had rebelled against Angevin rule. Hoping to secure Messina as a bridgehead to reconquer the rest of Sicily, Charles of Anjou conducted a successful naval crossing of the Strait of Messina, but several assaults on the city failed.

After five weeks of siege, the Messinese defenders were reinforced by an Aragonese relief force. Facing mounting casualties and supply issues, the Angevin army lifted the siege and made a costly withdraw back across the strait to Calabria. The victorious Aragonese–Sicilian forces followed up the siege with a series of military actions to harass the retreating Angevins, and the failure to take Messina was an early defeat for the Angevin Kingdom in the Vesperan conflict.

== Background ==
=== Sicilian Vespers ===
In the late 13th century, the island of Sicily was under the control of the Angevin Kingdom of Naples, ruled by Charles of Anjou. Charles had invaded and conquered the Kingdom of Sicily, which comprised both insular Sicily, Calabria, and Naples, in 1266, overthrowing and killing Manfred I of Sicily. Following Manfred's death, Charles occupied southern Italy with his army, while the island of Sicily submitted to Charles' authority without major resistance. However, the island remained a hotbed of anti-Angevin support.

Located in the northeast corner of Sicily, the city of Messina was key to the control of the island; In addition to being a hub of Sicilian commerce, it was a center of Sicilian shipbuilding and controlled the vital Strait of Messina. Following his conquest of the Kingdom of Sicily in 1266, Charles took advantage of Messina's proximity to his capital in Naples, establishing Messina as a strongpoint of Angevin control over the island. Charles relocated administrative functions to Messina from Palermo (the former capital of Sicily), invested a large Angevin garrison in Messina, and transformed the city's port into a major naval base. Charles hoped to offset Palermo's traditional influence over Sicilian politics, and planned to militarily expand his kingdom into Byzantium via ships built in Messinese shipyards.

In March 1282, Sicily erupted into revolt against Angevin Naples with the outbreak of the Sicilian Vespers. Starting in Palermo, the rebellion spread eastward, resulting in the collapse of Angevin rule over the island. Of the major cities of Sicily, only Messina did not join the revolt. Messina had a number of reasons for refraining from rebelling; the city housed a large Angevin garrison and was the home port of an Angevin crusader fleet, was geographically close to Charles' capital at Naples, and the city had benefitted economically from a large military buildup started by Charles in the 1270s. During a rebellion of Sicilians against Charles in 1268, Messina had been a stronghold of Angevin loyalist support, and had contributed troops to assist Charles in crushing the rebellion.

=== Messinese revolt ===
Despite conflicting Messinese views on the rebellion, with weeks of the Versperan revolt rebel sentiment in the city had begun to rise. The success of the revolt in other Sicilian cities, coupled with a slow Angevin response to the rebellion, eroded Charles' control over the city and emboldened the rebels. On 13 April, emissaries from Palermo arrived in Messina, urging the city to join the rebellion.

Inside Messina, the Angevin vicar Herbert of Orleans tried to maintain Angevin authority; Ignoring rising reports of discontent, Hebert believed that the main threat to Angevin-controlled Messina was rebels infiltrating the city from the west and south. As such, he reinforced Angevins forts guarding the mountainous hills to the west of Messina and dispatched a contingent of 500 Messinese crossbowmen to guard the town of Taormina. However, the withdraw of these troops from the city caused rebel sentiment to flare up. In mid-April, Herbert sent a force of Angevin cavalry to relive the Messinese garrison in Taormina, questioning their loyalty. Angered by this action, the Messinese commander took the Angevin cavalrymen prisoner. On 28 April, the city erupted into full-scale revolt, and Herbert and the Angevin garrison withdrew to the city's citadel, the formidable castle Mategriffon, leaving the rest of the city to the rebels. Led initially by Captain of the People Bartolomeo Maniscalco, the citizens of Messina declared the city a free commune, independent of Angevin rule. After several days' negotiations, Herbert was allowed to leave the city peacefully. In the chaos that followed the Angevin withdraw, rioters seized the city's shipyards and burned the Angevin fleet stationed there, a major blow to Charles' navy.

Despite the loss of Sicily, Charles of Anjou and the Angevin kingdom remained a potent military force. Drawing on the resource of his feudal holdings in Provence, Greece, and southern Italy, Charles amassed an army and fleet in Calabria. While Charles gathered his forces, representatives from the major cities on Sicily convened a parliament, hoping to discuss what the future of the island would be. A former magistrate, Baldwin Mussone, and an elected council of four judges were named as the leaders Messina. Having chosen a leader, Messina sent delegates to the new Sicilian parliament.

== Siege ==
=== Opening moves ===
In the summer of 1282, Charles of Anjou began to muster his forces in southern Italy. Charles' plan was to cross the straits of Messina, take the city, and then use Messina as a beachhead to invade the rest of Sicily. While the Messinese organized their city's defenses, by June Charles had amassed 31,000 men and 82 ships in Catona, less than five miles away. Having lost a large number of ships when Messina drove out the Angevin garrison, Charles was forced to rely on a cobbled-together fleet of ships from his lands in Provence and southern Italy, supplemented by mercenary ships from Genoa, Pisa, and Venice. The Angevin army of 31,000 men, while large, was partially made up of feudal levies, who possessed limited combat experience and motivation. The first Angevin attempt to land on Sicily came on 2 June, when a force of 40 Angevin galleys attempted to make a landing north of the city before being forced to withdraw.

On 24 June a second Angevin landing attempt was made, succeeding in landing 5,500 Angevin troops near Milazzo, some twenty miles northwest of Messina. A force of Messinese militia was sent to counter this landing, but was engaged in battle and defeated, with over a thousand Mesinese casualties. The Angevins cut the coastal road running from Messina to Palermo via Milazzo, and the victorious Angevins marched south towards the city. In the aftermath of the defeat, Mussone was replaced as Captain of the People by Alaimo da Lentini. Lentini ordered the Messinese militias back behind the walls of the city, not wanted to risk further field battles with the Angevins.

In late July, Charles led the bulk of the Angevin army across the strait, making an uncontested landing four miles south of Messina. With an Angevin army pressing the city from the north, Charles and his army moved to surround the southern approaches to Messina. His encirclement of the city complete, Charles held a council of war to determine whether the city should be taken by storm or siege, ultimately deciding on the latter approach. The Angevin army of 31,000 men greatly outnumbered the Messinese garrison (which had at most 8,000 men), but Charles likely wanted to take the city and its vital port facilities intact. Charles was also aware that Messina had traditionally been a bastion of pro-Angevin support on Sicily, and so may have hoped to take the city without costly military action against the Messinese. Charles' forces burned the farmland on the outskirts of the city, hoping to starve Messina into submission, while his fleet blockaded the harbor.

With the Angevin encirclement of the city complete, both sides settled in for a siege. Charles began probing the Messinese defenses for weaknesses. He first attacked the Braccio di San Raineri, a sandy sliver of land that commanded Messina's harbor, but was unable to take a monastery the Messinese had fortified on the point. Unable to take the harbor, Charles re-oriented his assaults to capture the Monte della Caperrina, a prominent hill on the city's outskirts from which the Angevins could bombard the city with siege engines. Early attempts to take the hill by storm failed, as Lentini had ordered it fortified with trenches.

=== Sicilian diplomacy and Aragonese intervention ===
While the siege of Messina progressed, the political situation on Sicily remained uncertain. The newly formed Sicilian parliament was divided on what the political future of the island should be; one faction called for the island to seek the protection of the papacy, one wanted full Sicilian independence, while a third wanted to give the throne of Sicily to King Peter III of Aragon, whose wife Constance of Sicily was considered by some Sicilians to be the lawful heir to the Sicilian throne.

While the parliament debated, Messina remained under siege. In early summer, a papal envoy, Cardinal Gerardo da Parma, was allowed into the besieged city to negotiate with the Messinese. The defenders hoped he could be convinced to extend papal protection to the city; instead, Parma demanded the city surrender to Charles and delivered a papal censure to the Sicilian rebels, threatening further consequences if the city did not capitulate. The papal rebuke convinced many Sicilians to join the pro-Aragonese faction in the Sicilian parliament, which saw value in have Aragon as an ally against Angevin Naples. Peter of Aragon wanted to gain the Sicilian throne, and so in the summer of 1282 had sailed an army to the port of Collo in North Africa, using the prospect of a crusade as political cover. The Aragonese king landed his army of 8,600 men at Trapani on 30 August, marching on to Palermo to be crowned as King of Sicily. The Sicilian parliament crowned Peter as king on 2 September, and Peter began mustering an army to relieve Messina. While he ordered his main force to concentrate in the town of Randazzo, some 50 miles west of Messina, Peter sent an advanced force of 2,000 almogavars—elite infantrymen from the foothills of Aragon—and 500 crossbowmen as an advanced guard to disrupt the Angevin besiegers of the city. The advanced force, led by Sicilian exiles Niccola di Palizzi and Andrea da Procida, conducted a rapid advance to Messina, making the usual six-day trek in three days.

While Aragon moved, Angevin Naples remained mired in siege warfare in front of Messina. Aragon's arrival in the conflict complicated Charles' siege of Messina; while he had heard rumors of Aragonese intervention, and possibly had received direct confirmation that Aragonese envoys were on Sicily in late August, he did not immediately take action. On 2 September, Charles ordered another major assault on the Monte della Caperrina, but was repulsed again. On the night of 5 September, the advance Aragonese force of 2,500 men arrived outside Messina, and successfully established themselves in the foothills of the city, undetected by the Angevin army. Some of the Aragonese advanced even further and made it inside the city walls, a huge boost to the Messinese defender's morale. The next morning, the Messinese defenders launched their first counterattack since July; Messinese defenders sallied forth from the city gates, taking the Angevins by surprise, while Aragonese almogavars and light cavalrymen attacked from the high ground. The sally did major damage to the Angevin siege lines, killing several hundred Angevin soldiers and resulting in some siege engines and supplies being burned.

Despite the success of the Aragonese sally, Messina remained under siege. In addition, Charles of Anjou was now aware that Aragon had entered the war and had landed an army on Sicily. Realizing the need to capture Messina before the main Aragonese force under Peter arrived, or before the powerful Aragonese navy cut his lines of communication to Calabria, Charles began to prepare a major assault on the city. On 15 September, the Angevin army stormed the city walls in force, fighting a fierce battle with the Aragonese-Sicilian defenders before being forced to retreat. The assault was costly for the Angevins; hundreds of men were killed attempting the scale the walls of Messina, while an attempt by the blockading fleet to simultaneously capture the city's harbor ended in failure. Charles himself was almost killed by a Messinese ballista bolt, which instead killed two of his bodyguards. As the battered Angevin army withdrew from the walls, the Messinese garrison sallied from the city gates, inflicting further casualties on the Angevins.

Having failed to storm the city, Charles and his army withdrew several miles from the city walls. The Angevin army, though badly battered, still had some months of supplies left, and so Charles wanted to continue the siege. In an attempt to peacefully capture Messina, Charles sent an emissary to Lentini, offering a large sum of money and a general pardon for the Messinese if they surrendered, but Lentini dismissed this offer out of hand. On 16 September, envoys from Peter arrived at the Angevin camp, where Charles delivered an official rebuttal to Peter's claim on the Sicilian throne.

=== Angevin retreat ===
While Charles wanted to continue the siege, by mid-September the siege was becoming increasingly untenable. Angevin morale was low; Feudal levies that Charles had called into armed service were starting to see their contracts elapse, while the stockpiles of food brought to sustain the siege were depleted. In addition, news of the approach of the main Aragonese army bolstered the morale of the Messinese defenders, who now knew that the city was likely to be relieved. Acting on the advice of his war council, Charles decided to end the siege and evacuate his army across the straits of Messina. Charles and his court were able to make the crossing into Calabria without incident, but the large and unwieldy Angevin army was unable to evacuate quickly; rivalries between the hired Italian ships, the re-organization of supplies, and the size of the Angevin army all complicated the withdraw.

Observing the Angevin withdraw, the Aragonese-Sicilian defenders launched a series of raids against the Angevin siege lines, disrupting the Angevin army as it tried to withdraw. On 21 September, the garrison of Messina sallied forth in the evening, striking the remaining Angevin forces. The Aragonese advance penetrated the Angevin lines, burning ships and killing soldiers as they attempted to disembark onto the waiting ships. Hundreds of casualties were inflicted on the Angevins, and over a hundred watercraft were burned. Contemporary Catalan chronicles claimed that 2,500 Angevins were killed or captured in the attack, and that the light of the burning Angevin ships could be seen in Catona. By the end of September, no Angevin troops remained on Sicily.

== Aftermath ==
Having successfully defended their city, the Messinese sent envoys to Peter. They found the royal army camped in Randazzo, where they informed Peter that the Angevins had been defeated and forced to withdraw. Peter and the Aragonese-Sicilian army arrived in Messina in late September, where Peter was received with a hero's welcome, his authority as king of Sicily greatly bolstered. In the weeks after the Angevin withdraw, the large and highly capable Aragonese navy harried the scattered Angevin fleet, defeating it in the Battle of Nicotera.

The failed siege of Messina was a major setback for Charles of Anjou and Angevin Naples. While the kingdom still possessed a formidable military, the failed military campaign in the summer of 1282 ended Angevin hopes of quickly crushing the Sicilian rebellion. Subsequent attempts by the Angevins to regain the strategic initiative in 1283 and 1284 ended in failure, and Angevin Naples would not land significant numbers of troops on Sicily until the Angevin invasion of 1298.

== Sources ==
- Pryor, John H. (1983), "The Naval Battles of Roger de Lauria", Journal of Medieval History, 9 (3), doi:10.1016/0304-4181(83)90031-3
- Stanton, Charles D. (2019), Roger of Lauria (c. 1250–1305): 'Admiral of Admirals', Woodbridge: Boydell & Brewer, ISBN 978-1-78327-453-6
- Welsh, William E. (2016). "Papal strongman: Charles of Anjou". Medieval Warfare. 6 (2). ISSN 2211-5129. JSTOR 48578551.
