= Gunter Jahn =

- Born: 27 September 1910; Hamburg
- Died: 12 April 1992 (aged 81); Krailling
- Military career
- Allegiance: Weimar Republic; Nazi Germany
- Branch: Reichsmarine; Kriegsmarine
- Service years: 1931–45
- Rank: Korvettenkapitän
- Commands: U-596 13 November 1941–27 July 1943; 29th U-boat Flotilla
- Awards: Knight's Cross of the Iron Cross

Gunter Jahn (27 September 1910 – 12 April 1992) was a German U-boat commander during World War II. He was born in Hamburg, Germany and began his naval career in April 1931 as a Seekadett. He first served on the light cruiser Nürnberg for more than two years, including nine patrols in the first year of the war.

In March 1941 Jahn joined the U-boat force and his first patrol was on board U-98 in September 1941. Later in November he commissioned U-596. On his second patrol he broke through the Strait of Gibraltar and went on to become one of the most successful U-boat commanders in the Mediterranean Sea. In July 1943 he left the boat and became the commander of the 29th U-boat Flotilla. In September 1944 he fell into French captivity, where he spent nearly two years.

== Awards ==
- Wehrmacht Long Service Award 4th Class (2 October 1936)
- Iron Cross (1939)
  - 2nd Class (18 October 1939)
  - 1st Class (6 October 1942)
- Medaille zur Erinnerung an die Heimkehr des Memellandes (20 December 1939)
- U-boat War Badge (1939) (6 October 1942)
- Knight's Cross of the Iron Cross on 30 April 1943 as Kapitänleutnant and commander of U-596

Military offices
Preceded by Korvettenkapitän Fritz Frauenheim	Commander of the 29th U-boat Flotilla; August 1943 – September 1944	Succeeded by disbanded
