= Punta Pezzo Lighthouse =

Punta Pezzo
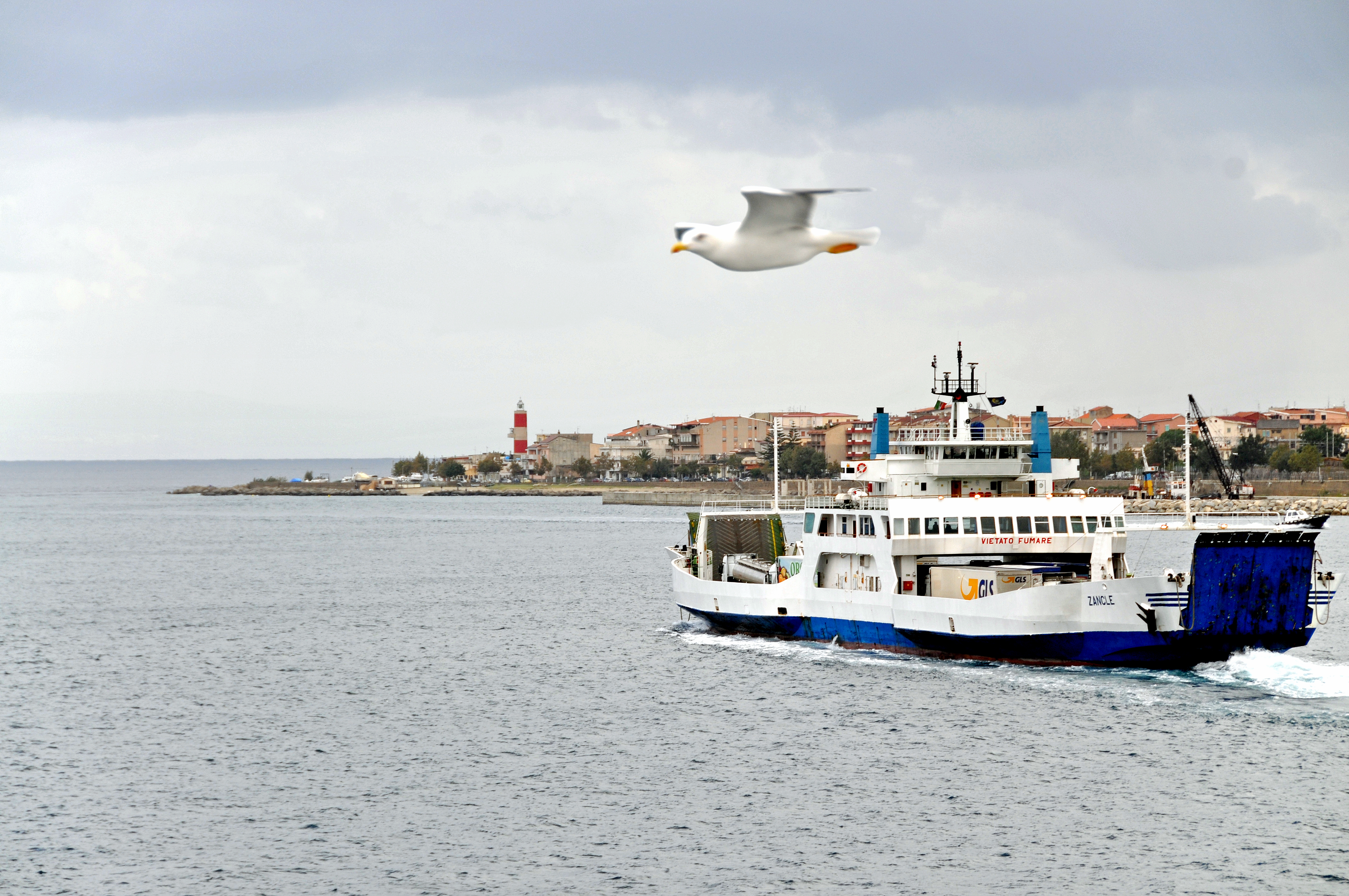
- The white and red lighthouse
- Location: Villa San Giovanni; Calabria; Italy
- Coordinates: 38°13′52″N 15°38′12″E

Tower
- Constructed: 1883 (first)
- Construction: concrete tower
- Height: 23 metres (75 ft)
- Shape: cylindrical tower and lantern
- Markings: white tower with red horizontal bands
- Power source: mains electricity
- Operator: Marina Militare

Light
- First lit: 1953 (current)
- Focal height: 26 metres (85 ft)
- Lens: type OR 250; Focal length: 125mm
- Intensity: AL 1000 W
- Range: main: 23 nautical miles (43 km; 26 mi) reserve: 13 nautical miles (24 km; 15 mi)
- Characteristic: Fl (3) R 15s.
- Italy no.: 2720 E.F

Punta Pezzo Lighthouse (Faro di Punta Pezzo) is an active lighthouse located in Punta Pezzo, the closest point of Calabria to Sicily.

== Description ==
The lighthouse consists of a 23 metres (75 ft) high cylindrical tower with red and white horizontal stripes, built in the 1953 and operated by Marina Militare identified by the code number 2720 E.F.. The rotating optical lantern emits three red flashes in a 15 seconds period visible at 23 nautical miles (43 km; 26 mi) of distance. In exceptional cases, the light is yellow, and visible for 18 nautical miles (33 km).

== See also ==
- List of lighthouses in Italy
