= German submarine U-596 =

German World War II submarine

History

Nazi Germany
- Name: U-596
- Ordered: 16 January 1940
- Builder: Blohm & Voss, Hamburg
- Yard number: 572
- Laid down: 4 January 1941
- Launched: 17 September 1941
- Commissioned: 13 November 1941
- Fate: Scuttled on 30 September 1944 in the Mediterranean

General characteristics
- Class & type: Type VIIC submarine
- Displacement: 769 tonnes (757 long tons) surfaced; 871 t (857 long tons) submerged
- Length: 67.10 m (220 ft 2 in) o/a; 50.50 m (165 ft 8 in) pressure hull
- Beam: 6.20 m (20 ft 4 in) o/a; 4.70 m (15 ft 5 in) pressure hull
- Height: 9.60 m (31 ft 6 in)
- Draught: 4.74 m (15 ft 7 in)
- Installed power: 2,800–3,200 PS (2,100–2,400 kW; 2,800–3,200 bhp) (diesels); 750 PS (550 kW; 740 shp) (electric)
- Propulsion: 2 shafts; 2 × diesel engines; 2 × electric motors
- Speed: 17.7 knots (32.8 km/h; 20.4 mph) surfaced; 7.6 knots (14.1 km/h; 8.7 mph) submerged
- Range: 8,500 nmi (15,700 km; 9,800 mi) at 10 knots (19 km/h; 12 mph) surfaced; 80 nmi (150 km; 92 mi) at 4 knots (7.4 km/h; 4.6 mph) submerged
- Test depth: 230 m (750 ft); Crush depth: 250–295 m (820–968 ft)
- Complement: 4 officers, 40–56 enlisted
- Armament: 5 × 53.3 cm (21 in) torpedo tubes (four bow, one stern); 14 × torpedoes or 26 TMA mines; 1 × 8.8 cm (3.46 in) deck gun (220 rounds); 1 x 2 cm (0.79 in) C/30 AA gun

Service record
- Part of: 8th U-boat Flotilla; 13 November 1941 – 30 June 1942; 3rd U-boat Flotilla; 1 July – 18 November 1942; 29th U-boat Flotilla; 19 November 1942 – 24 September 1944
- Identification codes: M 42 884
- Commanders: Kptlt. Gunter Jahn; 13 November 1941 – 27 July 1943; Oblt.z.S. Victor-Wilhelm Nonn; 28 July 1943 – July 1944; Oblt.z.S. Hans Kolbus; July 1944 – 8 September 1944
- Operations: 12 patrols: 1st patrol: 8 August – 3 October 1942; 2nd patrol: 4 – 15 November 1942; 3rd patrol: 27 January – 16 February 1943; 4th patrol: 28 February – 12 March 1943; 5th patrol: a. 23 March – 15 April 1943; b. 26 – 30 April 1943; 6th patrol: 17 – 26 June 1943; 7th patrol: 10 August – 10 September 1943; 8th patrol: 28 September – 10 October 1943; 9th patrol: 30 November – 28 December 1943; 10th patrol: 12 February – 11 March 1944; 11th patrol: 9 – 29 April 1944; 12th patrol: 29 July – 1 September 1944
- Victories: 12 merchant ships sunk (41,411 GRT); 1 warship sunk (246 tons); 2 merchant ships damaged (14,180 GRT)

German submarine U-596 was a Type VIIC U-boat built for Nazi Germany's Kriegsmarine for service during World War II. She was laid down on 4 January 1941 by Blohm & Voss in Hamburg as yard number 572, launched on 17 September 1941 and commissioned on 13 November under Kapitänleutnant Gunter Jahn. He was replaced on 28 July 1943 by Oberleutnant zur See Victor-Whilhelm Nonn who was superseded by Oblt.z.S. Hans Kolbus in July 1944.

The boat's service began on 13 November 1941 with training as part of the 8th U-boat Flotilla. She was transferred to the 3rd flotilla on 1 July 1942 and moved on to the 29th flotilla on 19 November.

== Design ==
German Type VIIC submarines were preceded by the shorter Type VIIB submarines. U-596 had a displacement of 769 tonnes (757 long tons) when at the surface and 871 tonnes (857 long tons) while submerged. She had a total length of 67.10 m (220 ft 2 in), a pressure hull length of 50.50 m (165 ft 8 in), a beam of 6.20 m (20 ft 4 in), a height of 9.60 m (31 ft 6 in), and a draught of 4.74 m (15 ft 7 in). The submarine was powered by two Germaniawerft F46 four-stroke, six-cylinder supercharged diesel engines producing a total of 2,800 to 3,200 metric horsepower (2,060 to 2,350 kW; 2,760 to 3,160 shp) for use while surfaced, two Brown, Boveri & Cie GG UB 720/8 double-acting electric motors producing a total of 750 metric horsepower (550 kW; 740 shp) for use while submerged. She had two shafts and two 1.23 m (4 ft) propellers. The boat was capable of operating at depths of up to 230 metres (750 ft).

The submarine had a maximum surface speed of 17.7 knots (32.8 km/h; 20.4 mph) and a maximum submerged speed of 7.6 knots (14.1 km/h; 8.7 mph). When submerged, the boat could operate for 80 nautical miles (150 km; 92 mi) at 4 knots (7.4 km/h; 4.6 mph); when surfaced, she could travel 8,500 nautical miles (15,700 km; 9,800 mi) at 10 knots (19 km/h; 12 mph). U-596 was fitted with five 53.3 cm (21 in) torpedo tubes (four fitted at the bow and one at the stern), fourteen torpedoes, one 8.8 cm (3.46 in) SK C/35 naval gun, 220 rounds, and a 2 cm (0.79 in) C/30 anti-aircraft gun. The boat had a complement of between forty-four and sixty.

== Service history ==
In twelve patrols, she sank twelve ships, including one warship for a total of 41,411 GRT.

Her initial sortie from Kiel was cut short by a battery explosion on 28 June 1942. She was obliged to put into Bergen in Norway.

=== First patrol ===
Her first patrol saw her depart Bergen on 8 August 1942, cross the North Sea and move through the gap between Iceland and the Faroe Islands into the Atlantic. There she sank the Suecia with a torpedo on 16 August, having first checked the ships' papers. She also sank the Empire Hartebeeste on 20 September, but was attacked by HNoMS Potentilla and HMS Viscount on 24 August. No damage was sustained. U-596 lost a man overboard on 30 August in mid-Atlantic. The boat then docked at St. Nazaire in occupied France on 3 October.

=== Second patrol ===
Her next foray from St. Nazaire took the U-boat as part of group 'Delphin' to La Spezia in northern Italy. Her route involved passing the heavily defended Strait of Gibraltar, which she successfully accomplished in the darkness during the period of the new moon from 8–10 November 1942.

=== Third and fourth patrols ===
U-596's third patrol took her past the Balearic Islands to the Algerian coast near Oran. It was unsuccessful.

Her fourth foray yielded some reward. Between Algiers and Oran, she damaged Fort Norman and Empire Standard, both on 9 March 1943.

=== Fifth and sixth patrols ===
Her fifth outing, in the same area as her third and fourth patrols, was rewarded with the sinking of the Fort a la Corne west of Algiers on 30 March 1943.

Her home port was moved from La Spezia to Pola in Croatia; she sailed from there on her sixth patrol, but it was uneventful.

=== Seventh and eighth patrols ===
Patrol number seven was marked by the sinking of several Egyptian, a Palestinian and British-registered sailing ships off the Lebanon coast with her deck gun in August and September 1943.

During her eighth patrol, she sank Marit off the Libyan coast on 4 October, but was attacked by the British corvette HMS Gloxina. Although slightly damaged, the U-boat escaped.

=== Ninth, tenth and eleventh patrols ===
U-596 departed Pola on 30 November but it was not until many days later that she sank the Troop Transport Cap Padaran off Cape Spartivento in Italy on 9 December. She returned to Pola on 28 December 1943.

Another unsuccessful patrol passed between 12 February and 11 March 1944.

The boat barely left the Adriatic for patrol number eleven.

=== Twelfth patrol ===
What turned out to be the last complete patrol by a U-boat in the Mediterranean began with U-596's departure from Pola on 29 July 1944. Her route was to the Gulf of Sirte on the Libyan coast. Her arrival at Salamis in Greece was followed by the USAAF (United States Army Air Forces) bombing the port on 29 September (USAAF records say the 25th). The boat was sufficiently damaged that the crew was forced to abandon her and join the general retreat through Athens.

=== Fate ===
The submarine was scuttled on 30 September 1944 in Skaramanga Bay, near Salamis in position 37°59′N 23°34′E. One person died; the number of survivors is unknown.

== Summary of raiding history ==
Date	Ship Name	Nationality	Tonnage (Note: Merchant ship tonnages are in gross register tons. Military vessels are listed by tons displacement.)	Fate
16 August 1942	Suecia	Sweden	4,966	Sunk
20 September 1942	Empire Hartebeeste	United Kingdom	5,676	Sunk
7 February 1943	HMS LCI (L) 162	Royal Navy	246	Sunk
9 March 1943	Empire Standard	United Kingdom	7,047	Damaged
30 March 1943	Fort Norman	United Kingdom	7,133	Damaged
30 March 1943	Fort a la Corne	United Kingdom	7,133	Sunk
30 March 1943	Hallanger	Norway	9,551	Sunk
20 August 1943	El Sayeda	Egypt	68	Sunk
21 August 1943	Lily	British Mandate for Palestine	132	Sunk
21 August 1943	Namaz	United Kingdom	50	Sunk
21 August 1943	Panikos	United Kingdom	21	Sunk
30 August 1943	Nagwa	Egypt	183	Sunk
7 September 1943	Hamidieh	Egypt	80	Sunk
4 October 1943	Marit	Norway	5,542	Sunk
9 December 1943	Cap Padaran	United Kingdom	8,009	Sunk

== Bibliography ==
- Busch, Rainer; Röll, Hans-Joachim (1999). German U-boat commanders of World War II : a biographical dictionary. Translated by Brooks, Geoffrey. London, Annapolis, Md: Greenhill Books, Naval Institute Press. ISBN 1-55750-186-6.
- Busch, Rainer; Röll, Hans-Joachim (1999). Der U-Boot-Krieg, 1939-1945: Deutsche U-Boot-Verluste von September 1939 bis Mai 1945 [German U-boat losses from September 1939 to May 1945] (in German). Vol. IV. Hamburg, Berlin, Bonn: Mittler. ISBN 3-8132-0514-2.
- Gröner, Eric; Jung, Dieter; Maass, Martin (1991). German Warships 1815-1945: U-boats and Mine Warfare Vessels. Vol. 2. Translated by Thomas, Keith; Magowan, Rachel. London: Conway Maritime Press. ISBN 0-85177-593-4.
