= SS Yankee Arrow =

American oil tanker (1921–1948)

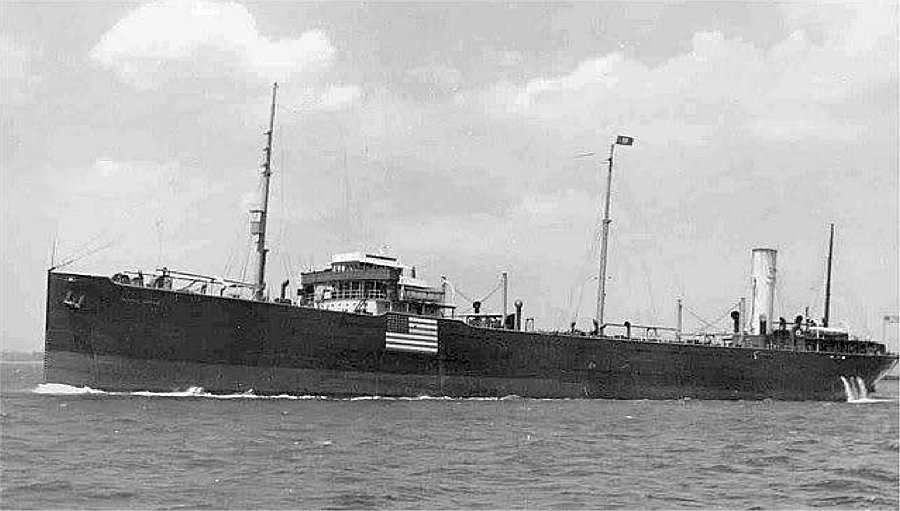
- Yankee Arrow during World War II with an American flag on her side, displayed as a neutrality marking

History
- Name: Yankee Arrow
- Namesake: Yankee, a nickname for people from the United States
- Owner: Socony (1921–1943); War Shipping Board (1943–1948); F. Heuvelmans (1948)
- Operator: Standard Transportation Co. (1921–1943); United States Maritime Administration (1943–1948); F. Heuvelmans (1948)
- Port of registry: New York, New York
- Ordered: August 1, 1919
- Builder: New York Shipbuilding Corporation
- Yard number: 260
- Launched: May 10, 1921
- Completed: August 2, 1921
- In service: 1921–1943 (as an oil tanker); 1943–1945 (as a fuel storage ship)
- Identification: Official number: 221457
- Fate: Scrapped in Belgium, 1948

General characteristics
- Class & type: Arrow-class oil tanker
- Tonnage: 8,046 GRT; 14,800 DWT
- Length: 468 feet (143 m)
- Beam: 62.6 feet (19.1 m)
- Depth: 39.6 feet (12.1 m)
- Speed: 10.5 knots (12.1 mph; 19.4 km/h)

SS Yankee Arrow was an Arrow-class oil tanker built in 1921 for the Standard Oil Company of New York (Socony). She struck a mine on August 2, 1943, off the coast of Tunisia, which damaged the tanker and caused a fire. She served as fuel storage off Sicily for several years, before finally being scrapped in 1948.

== Construction ==
Yankee Arrow was ordered on August 1, 1919. She launched by New York Shipbuilding Corporation in Camden, New Jersey, on May 10, 1921, as hull number 260. She was completed and delivered on August 2 of the same year. The tanker was assigned the official number 221457.

=== Specifications ===
Yankee Arrow was 468 feet (143 m) long, 62.6 feet (19.1 m) wide, and had a depth of 39.6 feet (12.1 m). She had a gross register tonnage of 8,046 and a deadweight tonnage of 13,400. The tanker had a top speed of 10.5 knots (12.1 mph; 19.4 km/h), and an internal horsepower of 3,200.

== Service history ==
Yankee Arrow entered service with the Standard Transportation Company, a subsidiary of Socony, on August 2, 1921.

=== World War II ===
On January 30, 1942, at 11:30 GMT, Yankee Arrow sent an SSS signal and reported that she was being chased by a German U-boat. At 16:30, while at 39°22'N 74-00W and traveling 9 knots, the tanker reported that the U-boat was disappearing 6 miles (9.7 km) astern.

==== Mine collision ====
On August 2, 1943, the tanker was sailing in convoy KMS 20 from Annaba, Algeria, to Bizerte, Tunisia. The convoy began forming a single column to enter the Tunisian port. Sailing off Cape Bon, Yankee Arrow suddenly struck a naval mine off her port bow. The ship was engulfed by a fire that was brought under control about half an hour later. Her crew did not abandon ship, though the initial blast blew several sailors overboard. Yankee Arrow was heavily damaged and deemed unfit for further war service. Two armed guards and five merchant sailors died.

==== As a fuel storage ship ====
The tanker was purchased by the War Shipping Administration and serving as fuel storage off Sicily for several years. She was finally laid up in the port of Marseille, France, in July 1945. In 1948, she was sold to F. Heuvelmans in Antwerp, Belgium. After arriving on November 1, Yankee Arrow was scrapped towards the end of the year.
