= Punta Pezzo =

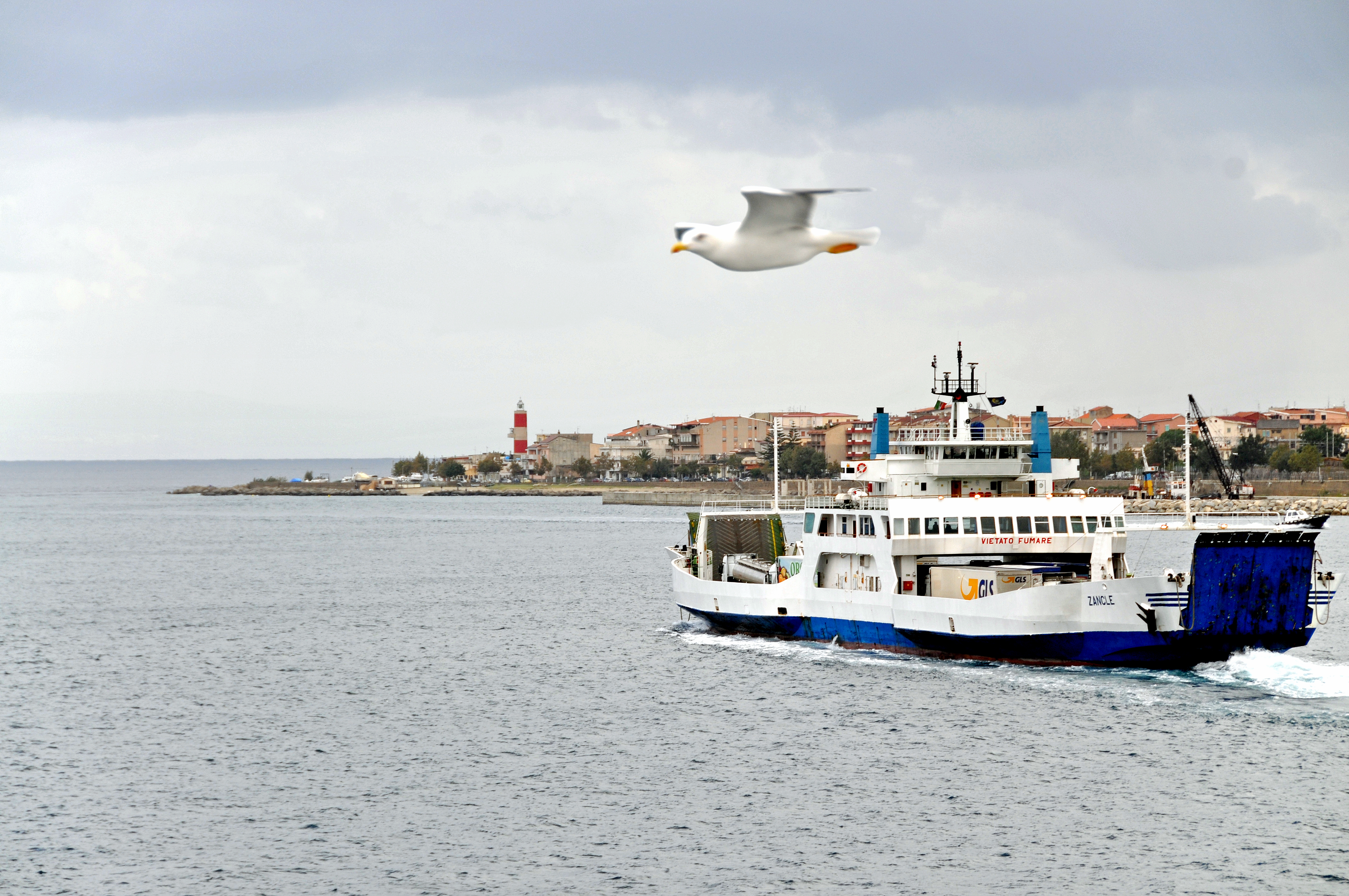
The white and red lighthouse

Punta Pezzo is a point in Reggio Calabria, southern Italy. It is the closest point in Calabria to Sicily and the northernmost point of the Calabrian side of the Strait of Messina, lying on the northern channel.

== Overview ==
The coasts of this sea area are crossed by very strong currents and the topography of the beaches varies from year to year due to powerful winter storms. It is located in the comune of Villa San Giovanni, about 13 km north of Reggio Calabria.

== See also ==
- Punta Pezzo Lighthouse
