= Catona =

Urban district of Reggio Calabria, Italy

Coordinates: 38°11′12.42″N 15°37′55″E

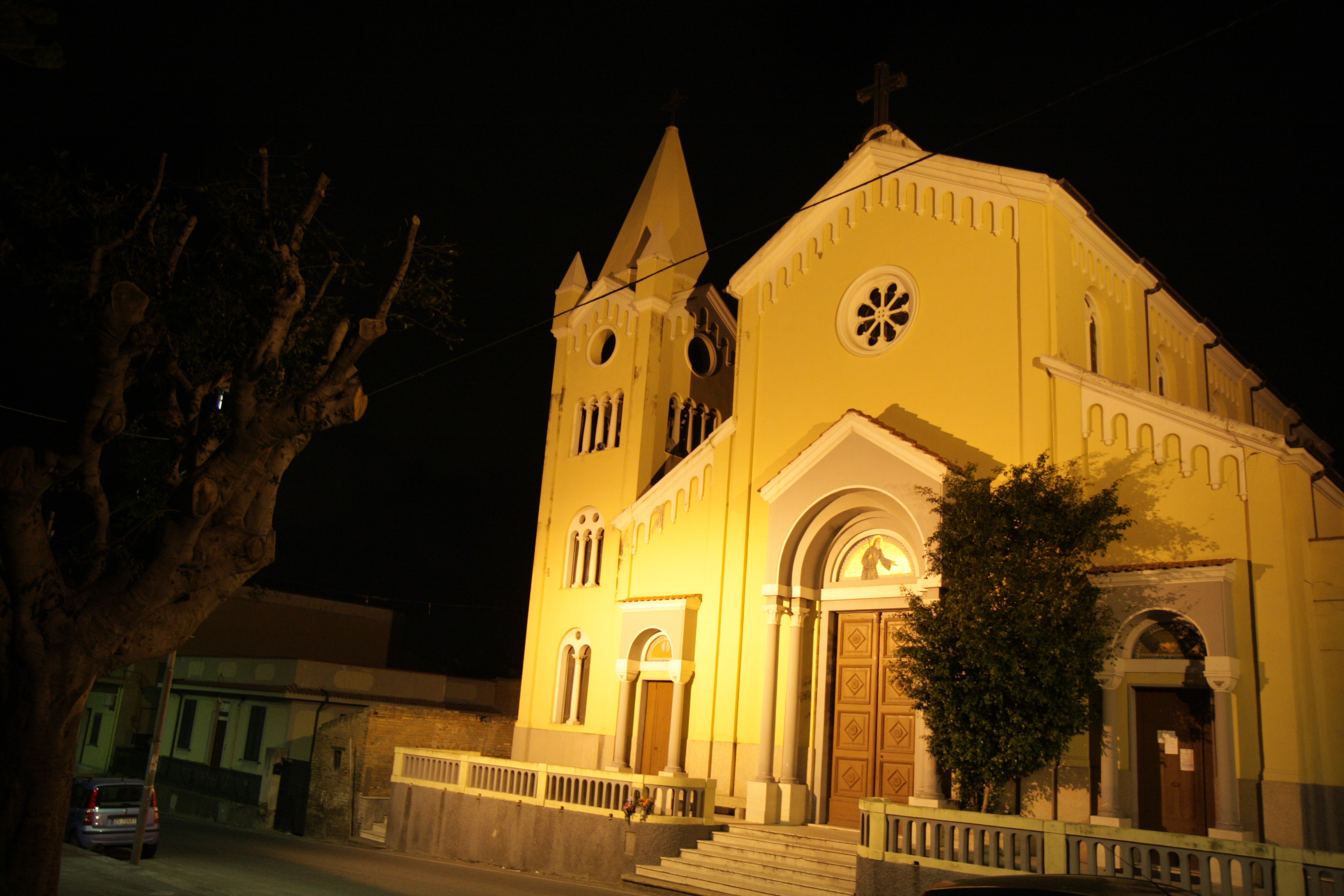
Saint Francis of Paola church, in Catona.

Catona (in the local dialect A Catùna) is an urban district (independent municipality until 1927) of Reggio Calabria, Italy, as part of the 8th district with neighborhoods Salice, Villa San Giuseppe and Rosalì. With about 15,000 inhabitants it is in the coastal area the northernmost district of the city, it borders to the north with Villa San Giovanni, to the south with Gallico; it overlooks the Strait of Messina. Etymology: Katà ta bounà> Kat'vouna> Catuna. "Byzantine" and modern Greek. "Under the mountains".

== History ==
In Roman times it is believed that there was located the boarding station for Sicily called "ad fretum ad statuam". In fact, the Roman Via Popilia reached Catona. In 1283 it was devastated during the war of Vespers. Dante Alighieri, in canto VIII of Paradiso, mentions the district of Catona:

...e quel corno d'Ausonia che s'imborga
di Bari, di Gaeta e di Catona
da ove Tronto e Verde in mare sgorga...

— Dante Alighieri

Through the story of Charles Martel of Anjou, Dante describes the kingdom as a triangle between Bari East, West and Gaeta Catona South.

In the Middle Ages, Catona was a fortress and was the theater of a war between the Angevins and Aragonese. For Dante, "Ausonia" is synonymous with Italy.

In addition, Giovanni Boccaccio, in a note from Dante Alighieri’s Commedia, mentions Catona:

...Tra Messina in Cicilia e una punta di Calavria, ch’è di rincontro ad essa, chiamata Capo di Volpe, non guari lontana ad una terra chiamata Catona e a Reggio, è uno stretto di mare pericolosissimo...

— Giovanni Boccaccio

== Events ==
Catonateatro is important in the cultural landscape of Reggio Calabria, offering theatrical and musical events each year at "Arena Bianchi" on the "Catona promenade". The anniversary of the procession dedicated to Saint Francis of Paola is very important and it takes place on the second Sunday following Easter Sunday, as well as the procession of the Sacred Hearts of Jesus and Mary in summer. Also, in summer there is the Latin sailing festival of the strait, the corricatona and the Eggplant Festival in Salice.

== Tourism ==
Catona beach, 1.5 km long, is among the sites of Community importance, that is places of considerable environmental interest in the EEC (Catona Beach IT9350183); formed by a white sand of medium garnet color and is pleasant for the swimmer. The sea is transparent, crystal clear, cold and normally calm (unless there is a Sirocco wind). The beach of Catona has one feature: just dig a hole in the sand to find fresh water, even on the coast.

== Legend ==
In 1464 St. Francis of Paula was refused passage by a boatman while trying to cross the Strait of Messina to Sicily. He reportedly laid his cloak on the water, tied one end to his staff as a sail, and sailed across the strait with his companions following in the boat. A description of the event is known nell'arazzo Edward Steinle, is preserved in the Vatican, in the gallery of the maps.

The Convent of the Minims, built in 1629, after several reconstructions, is found in Catona. "The miracle of St. Francis" is remembered in Catona promenade with a monument of considerable size (about 15 m) of G. Polimeni. Another sandstone monument represents the saint. Sculpted in 1702 it was initially placed where the miracle happened. After the extension of the promenade, the monumental work was moved a hundred meters from the water line on private property and is no longer available for visitors.

== Notables ==
- Servant of God Sister Brigida Maria Postorino, who founded the Religious Institute of the Daughters of Mary Immaculate, which inspired the birth of the movement of the Church of the Friends of Mary Immaculate.
- Antonino Barillà, football player for the Reggina Calcio.

== Places of worship ==
- St. Denis Church
- St. Francis of Paola Basilica (within which is shown a picture of the contemporary Calabrian painter Giuseppe Mainieri)
- St. Aurelius Bishop and Martyr Church (Arghillà)
- St. Mary of Good Counsel Church (Concessa)

== Statues and memorials ==
- Monument to sailors fallen into the sea

Built in 2000 by the sculptor Gennaro Carresi.

- War memorial

Built in 1937, the monument consists of a quadrangular base where the pedestal rests with the inscription of the names of the fallen of the First World War; on top there is the eagle with its wings outstretched, while on the left there is the allegory of victory. It is located in Piazza Matteotti Catona.

- War memorial

Located in Rosalí

- Monument Dante Alighieri
- Monument San Francesco di Paola

Monument of considerable size (about 15m) by G. Polimeni

- Bust Dr. Walter Flesca

Located on the seafront, made by the sculptor Rosario La Seta

- Monumental fountain

Located in Villa San Giuseppe and built in 1875.
