= Raimondo de' Cabanni =

Black African Neapolitan Knight

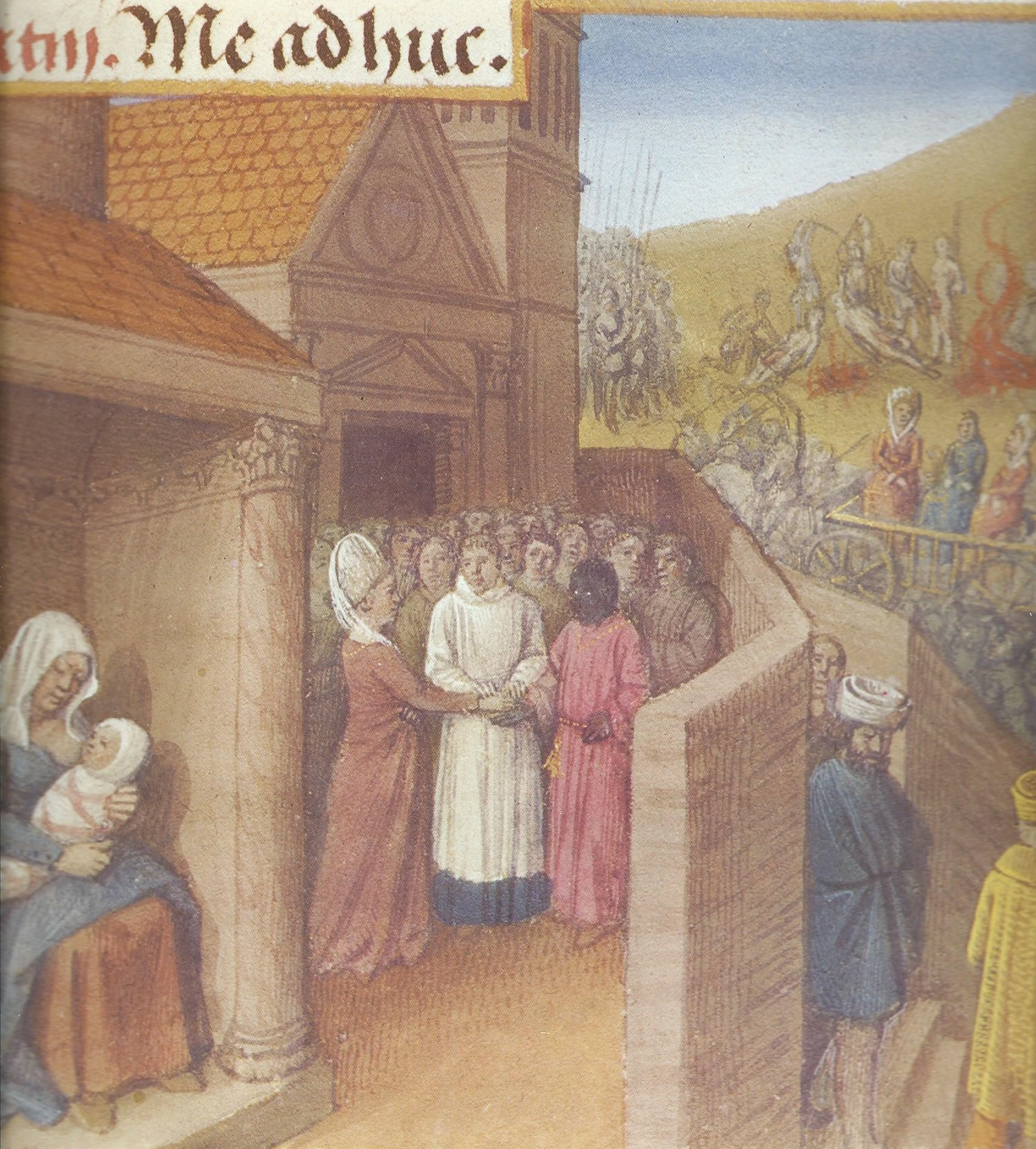
Wedding of Raimondo and Philippa, from a manuscript of a French translation of Boccaccio, illustrated by Jean Fouquet (1458). The wedding is in the centre, while Philippa as a wetnurse is seen at left and at right, in the background, the torture of Philippa and her son.

Raimondo de' Cabanni, (Note: May also be spelled Raimondo de Cabanni without the apostrophe or also Raimondo de Cabannis. In the Latin of Boccaccio: Raymundus de Capannis.) also called Raymond of Campania (Note: May also be given in French as Raymond de Campagne.) (died October 1334), was a Neapolitan knight and courtier of black African origin. Through a combination of his own abilities and an advantageous marriage to one of the queen's inner circle, he rose through the ranks to hold the highest office in the royal household by the time of his death.

== Origins and early life ==
The only information on Raimondo's origins and early life are found in the last chapter of Giovanni Boccaccio's The Fates of Illustrious Men, (Note: This can be found in English translation in The Fates of Illustrious Men, trans. Louis Brewer Hall (New York: Frederick Ungar Publishing, 1965), pp. 235–40. The original Latin of chapter XXVI of book nine De Phylippa cathinensi (On Philippa of Catania) can be found at the Bibliotheca Augustana. Boccaccio exhibits a racist attitude, as when he remarks, in Hall's translation, "What a ridiculous thing to see an African from a slave prison, from the vapor of the kitchen, standing before Robert, the King, performing royal service for the young nobleman, governing the court and making laws for those in power!") written around 1360. Boccaccio claims to have heard the details from two elderly Neapolitan officials, Marino Bulgaro and Costantino della Rocca, (Note: Or Costanzo de Rocca. He was the notary and treasurer of Queen Sancha and is mentioned in numerous documents. The epitaph on his tomb in Santa Chiara, now gone, read: Hic iacet magister Constantinus de Rocca thesaurarius reginalis qui obiit anno domini 1334 die 21 Junii (Here lies master Costantino della Rocca, treasurer of the queen, who died in the year of our Lord 1334, on the 21st day of June).) during the time he frequented the Neapolitan court as a young man between 1327 and 1341.

Boccaccio's account is consistent, where it can be checked, with what is known from contemporary documents. That Raimondo was a black African is likely, since a treaty of 1275 greatly limited the legal trade in slaves between Naples and its nearest African neighbour, the Hafsid Caliphate, by forbidding the capture or importation of Hafsid subjects as slaves, thus shifting demand to non-Hafsid (i.e. black) African slaves. Boccaccio claims that Raimondo was "an Ethiopian (Note: Boccaccio uses the word aethiops.) man who had in all respects such figure and color as have the Ethiopians who are otherwise called Moors." He was originally a slave sold by pirates to Raimondo de' Cabanni, provost of the royal kitchens. This Raimondo, recognising the boy's abilities, freed him, had him baptized, gave him his name and named him his heir in both his property and his office.

== Rise at court ==
The earliest document to mention Raimondo is dated 6 February 1305. It records that Robert, Duke of Calabria, son of King Charles II, granted an annual pension of 20 oncie to Raimondo on the occasion of his marriage to Philippa of Catania, (Note: Philippa, a washerwoman and fisherman's widow, was hired by Robert in 1301. Robert's wife, Yolanda, died in 1302.) wet nurse of Robert's second son, Louis. (By comparison, the annual salary of a professor at the University of Naples was between 10 and 20 oncie.) The document states that the marriage took place in that year. Since the Neapolitan chancery began the year on 1 September, Raimondo's marriage must have taken place between 1 September 1304 and 6 February 1305. The marriage took place in the church of Santa Maria La Nova.

His rapid rise in the Angevin court cannot be completely retraced in the documents. Probably he owed his rise partially to his wife's influence as the governess of Robert's children. According to Boccaccio, Raimondo, being an "extremely audacious man" (vir extrema audacia), asked for and received ennoblement and knighthood on the occasion of his wedding. There is no record of this in contemporary documents.

On 25 February 1311, Robert, now king, re-confirmed the pension he had granted six years earlier and at that time Raimondo was a familiaris of the court. The earliest document that calls Raimondo a "knight" (miles) is a charter from 1325 or 1326. At that time, he was a familiaris at the court of Robert's eldest son, Charles, Duke of Calabria, whom he served as chamberlain and as the master marshal in charge of his stables. By the time of his death, Raimondo had been promoted to the office of seneschal of the royal hospice, the highest office in the royal household.

Through royal favour and connections, he acquired a palace in Naples by the Porta della Fontana in the neighbourhood of the royal Castel Nuovo. He also acquired numerous fiefs of the crown, such as Minervino, Mottola and Pantano di Foggia, (Note: Pantano di Foggia, near the church of San Lorenzo in Carmignano, was the location of a park with a fishpond (vivarium) stocked with waterfowl built on the orders of Frederick II, Holy Roman Emperor.) as well as other fiefs from Charles of Calabria in the Terra d'Otranto. A document of 1324 shows him and his wife as co-owners with another couple (Note: Ruggiero Mabrone di Rossano and his wife Jeanne de Thuir, one of Queen Sancha's ladies in waiting.) of the castles of Cercepiccola, Sassinoro, San Pietro Avellana, Rocca del Vescovo, San Giuliano and Pacile. Other properties are known from the division made by his widow and children after his death.

On 14 June 1333, Raimondo and his sons Carlo and Perrotto were compensated with 10 oncie and 24 tarì for the loss of several of their horses which had died while in the king's service.

== Death and succession ==
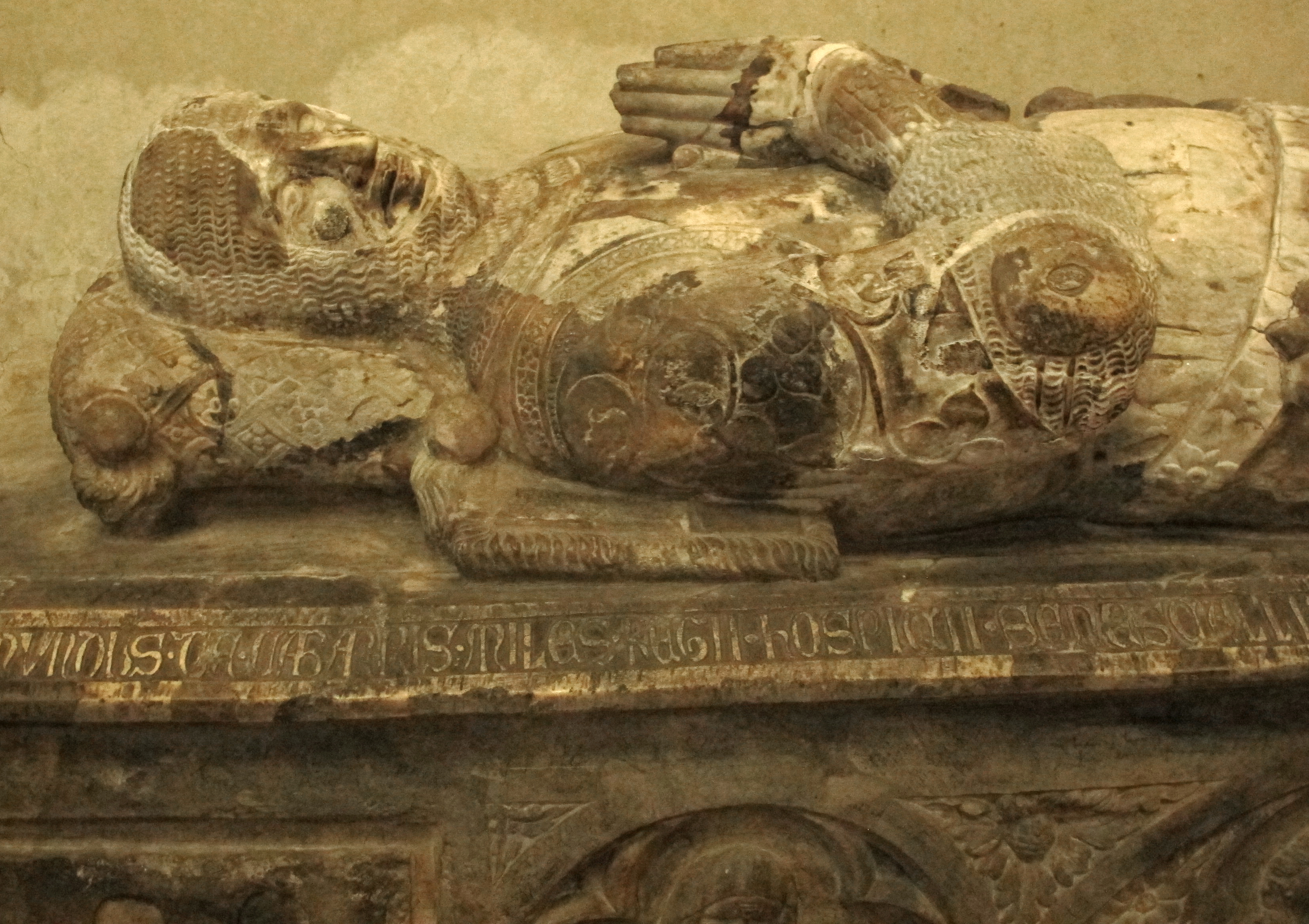
Detail of the tomb effigy of Raimondo.

Raimondo died in October 1334. He received a lavish funeral and was buried in the complex of Santa Chiara, the resting place of the Angevin kings. His monumental sepulchre is topped by his effigy in the figure of a recumbent knight in prayer. He left behind three children by Philippa:

- Carlo (dead by 1340). He served as vice-seneschal of the hospice and as royal chamberlain. He married a woman of the high nobility, Margherita da Ceccano, and they had four children: Raimondello, named after his father; Antonello; Sancia; and Giovannella. At his birth in 1328, Raimondello received a "woollen cloak decorated with parrots" (Note: roba panni de lana laborata ad pappagallos.) as a gift from the king. He was still a minor on 15 July 1345.
- Perrotto (died 1336). He also served as a chamberlain. His wife was named Francesca. He was buried beside his father in the same chapel in Santa Chiara, where is sarcophagus and effigy can still be viewed.
- Roberto (died 1345). He abandoned an ecclesiastical career to become count of Eboli and ultimately grand seneschal of the realm. He married Sichelgaita Filomarino and had a daughter, Caterina.

Following Raimondo's death, his widow, sons and daughter-in-law Francesca came to an agreement over several casalia he had owned, namely Lizzano, San Marzano, Roccelle and a part of Castrignano, Giuliano and the unidentified casalia of Pau et Piscarie and Tricase in the Terra d'Otranto.

Carlo and Roberto's daughters Sancia and Caterina were ladies in waiting to Queen Sancha in 1336. Sancia later became the countess of Morcone. In 1345, she was accused along with her mother and her surviving uncle of the assassination of Andrew, Duke of Calabria, the husband of Queen Joanna I. (Note: Philippa had been the primary caregiver of Joanna since the deaths of her father, Charles of Calabria, in 1328 and mother, Marie de Valois, in 1331. Boccaccio originally claimed that Joanna had a sexual relationship with Roberto, but he removed this claim when he revised The Fates around 1374.) All three were arrested, tortured and imprisoned. Philippa died in prison and Roberto was executed. On 16 May 1346, a declaration (provvedimento) was issued declaring Raimondello innocent in the assassination. This rapid collapse of the fortunes of the Cabanni family following Raimondo's death was the theme of Boccaccio's account.

== Bibliography ==
- Devisse, Jean; Mollat, Michel (1979). The Image of the Black in Western Art, Volume II: From the Early Christian Era to the "Age of Discovery", Part 2: Africans in the Christian Ordinance of the World (Fourteenth to the Sixteenth Century). New York: William Morrow and Co. ISBN 978-0-674-05258-1.
- Goldstone, Nancy (2009). The Lady Queen: The Notorious Reign of Joanna I, Queen of Naples, Jerusalem, and Sicily. New York: Walker and Company. ISBN 978-0-8027-7770-6.
- Houben, Hubert (2016). "La Ruota della fortuna: Africani neri alle corti dei re di Sicilia (secoli XII–XIV)". Itinerari di Ricerca Storica. 30 (2): 11–20.
- Kaplan, Paul H. D. (1987). "Black Africans in Hohenstaufen Iconography". Gesta. 26 (1): 29–36. doi:10.2307/767077. JSTOR 767077. S2CID 190825271.
- Musto, Ronald G. (2019). Writing Southern Italy Before the Renaissance: Trecento Historians of the Mezzogiorno. New York: Routledge. ISBN 9781351767392.
- Smurra, Rosa (2011). "Una storia di 'integrazione' nella Napoli angioina". Ricerche di Pedagogia e Didattica. 6 (1): 1–36.
- Walter, Ingeborg (1972). "Cabanni, Raimondo de". Dizionario Biografico degli Italiani (in Italian). Vol. 15: Buffoli–Caccianemici. Rome: Istituto dell'Enciclopedia Italiana. ISBN 978-88-12-00032-6.
