= Duchess of Calabria =

Duchess of Calabria was the traditional title of the wife of the heir apparent of the Kingdom of Naples after the accession of Robert of Naples. It was also adopted by the heads of certain Houses that had once claimed the Kingdom of Naples in lieu of the royal title.

There are at present two claimants to the title of Duchess of Calabria. In the Spanish context, it is the title for the wife of the head of the House of Bourbon-Two Sicilies, and in the Italian context it is the title for the wife of the heir to the Duke of Castro, the head of the Royal House.

== Capetian House of Anjou ==
| Picture | Name | Father | Birth | Marriage | Became Duchess | Ceased to be Duchess | Death | Spouse |
|---|---|---|---|---|---|---|---|---|
| | Yolanda of Aragon | Peter III of Aragon (Barcelona) | 1285 | 23 March 1297 | | 19 August 1302 | | Robert |
| | Sancha of Majorca | James II of Majorca (Barcelona) | 1285 | 20 September 1304 | | 5 May 1309 became Queen | 28 July 1345 | Robert |
| | Catherine of Austria | Albert I of Germany (Habsburg) | October 1295 | 23 June 1316 | | 18 January 1323 | | Charles |
| | Marie of Valois | Charles, Count of Valois (Valois) | 1309 | May 1324 | | 9 November 1328 husband's death | 23 October 1331 | Charles |
| | Joanna suo jure | Charles, Duke of Calabria (Anjou-Naples) | 1328 | 26 September 1333 | | 20 January 1343 couples' accession as King and Queen | 22 May 1382 | Andrew |

== House of Valois-Anjou ==
| Picture | Name | Father | Birth | Marriage | Became Duchess | Ceased to be Duchess | Death | Spouse |
|---|---|---|---|---|---|---|---|---|
| | Marie of Blois-Châtillon | Charles, Duke of Brittany (Blois-Châtillon) | 1343/5 | 9 July 1360 | 29 June 1380 husband's accession | 12 May 1382 became Titular Queen | 12 November 1404 | Louis I of Anjou |
| | Margaret of Savoy | Amadeus VIII, Duke of Savoy (Savoy) | 1410s or 7 August 1420 | 1424/31 August 1432 | | 12 November 1434 husband's death | 30 September 1479 | Louis III of Anjou |
| | Isabella, Duchess of Lorraine | Charles II, Duke of Lorraine (Lorraine) | 1400 | 24 October 1420 | 12 November 1434 husband's accession | 2 February 1435 became Queen | 28 February 1453 | René of Anjou |
After 1442, the Angevin ceased to rule Naples and Rene was the last Angevin to hold and later claim the title of King. All his successors as pretenders used the title Duke of Calabria throughout their life and never pretend to use the title King of Naples unlike the first few Angevin claimants.

Angevin Duchess of Calabria
| Marie de Bourbon | Charles I, Duke of Bourbon (Bourbon) | 1428 | 1444 | | 7 July 1448 | | John II, Duke of Lorraine |
| Jeanne de Lorraine | Frederick II of Vaudémont (Lorraine) | 1458 | 21 January 1474 | | 25 January 1480 | | Charles IV of Anjou |
| Joan, Countess of Tancarville | William, Count of Tancarville (Harcourt) | – | 9 September 1471 | 24 July 1473 husband's accession | 1485 marriage annulled | 8 November 1488 | René II, Duke of Lorraine |
| Philippa of Guelders | Adolf, Duke of Guelders (Egmond) | 9 November 1467 | 1 September 1485 | | 10 December 1508 husband's death | 26 February 1547 | René II, Duke of Lorraine |
| Renée de Bourbon-Montpensier | Gilbert, Count of Montpensier (Bourbon-Montpensier) | 1494 | 26 June 1515 | | 26 May 1539 | | Antoine, Duke of Lorraine |
| Christina of Denmark | Christian II of Denmark (Oldenburg) | November 1521 | 10 July 1541 | 14 June 1544 husband's accession | 12 June 1545 husband's death | 10 December 1590 | Francis I, Duke of Lorraine |
| Claude de Valois | Henry II of France (Valois) | 12 November 1547 | 19 January 1559 | | 21 February 1575 | | Charles III, Duke of Lorraine |
| Margherita Gonzaga | Vincent I of Gonzaga, Duke of Mantua and Montferrat (Gonzaga) | 2 October 1591 | 24 April 1606 | 14 May 1608 husband's accession | 31 July 1624 husband's death | 7 February 1632 | Henry II, Duke of Lorraine |
| Christina of Salm | Paul, Count of Salm (Salm) | May 1575 | 1597 | 25 November 1625 husband's accession | 1 December 1625 husband's abdication | 31 December 1627 | Francis II, Duke of Lorraine |
| Nicolette of Lorraine | Henry II, Duke of Lorraine (Vaudemont) | 3 October 1608 | 23 May 1621 | 1 December 1625 husband's accession | 19 January 1634 husband's abdication | 2 February 1657 | Charles IV, Duke of Lorraine |
| Claude of Lorraine | Henry II, Duke of Lorraine (Vaudemont) | 12 October 1612 | 17 February 1634 | | 2 August 1648 | | Nicholas II, Duke of Lorraine |
| Béatrix de Cusance | Claude François de Cusance, Baron of Belvoir (Cusance) | 27 December 1614 | 9 April 1637 | 1661 husband's restoration | 5 June 1663 | | Charles IV, Duke of Lorraine |
| Marie Louise d'Aspremont | Charles II, comte d'Aspremont (Aspremont) | 1651/52 | 1665 | | 18 September 1675 husband's death | 23 October 1692 | Charles IV, Duke of Lorraine |
| Élisabeth Charlotte d'Orléans | Philippe I, Duke of Orléans (Bourbon-Orléans) | 13 September 1676 | 13 October 1698 | | 27 March 1729 husband's death | 23 December 1744 | Leopold, Duke of Lorraine |
| Maria Theresa of Austria | Charles VI, Holy Roman Emperor (Habsburg) | 13 May 1717 | 12 February 1736 | | 18 August 1765 husband's death | 29 November 1780 | Francis I, Holy Roman Emperor |
| Maria Josepha of Bavaria | Charles VII, Holy Roman Emperor (Wittelsbach) | 30 March 1739 | 23 January 1765 | 18 August 1765 husband's accession | 28 May 1767 | | Joseph II, Holy Roman Emperor |
| Maria Luisa of Spain | Charles III of Spain (Bourbon) | 24 November 1745 | 5 August 1765 | 30 September 1790 husband's accession | 15 May 1792 | | Leopold II, Holy Roman Emperor |
| Maria Theresa of Naples and Sicily | Ferdinand I of the Two Sicilies (Bourbon) | 6 June 1772 | 15 August 1790 | 1 March 1792 husband's accession | 1804 ? | 13 April 1807 | Francis II, Holy Roman Emperor |

== House of Aragon ==
| Picture | Name | Father | Birth | Marriage | Became Duchess | Ceased to be Duchess | Death | Spouse |
|---|---|---|---|---|---|---|---|---|
| | Isabella of Clermont | Tristan de Clermont, Count of Copertino | 1424 | 30 May 1444/5 | | 27 June 1458 became Queen | 30 March 1465 | Duke Ferdinand |
| | Ippolita Maria Sforza | Francesco I Sforza (Sforza) | 18 April 1446 | 10 October 1465 | | 20 August 1484 | | Duke Alfonso |
| | Trogia Gazzela | – | – | – | | – | | Duke Alfonso |
| | Germaine of Foix | John of Foix, Viscount of Narbonne (Foix-Grailly) | 1488 | August 1526 | | 18 October 1538 | | Duke Ferdinand |
| | Mencía de Mendoza | Rodrigo Díaz de Vivar y Mendoza (Mendoza) | 30 November 1508 | February 1540 | | 26 October 1550 husband's death | 4 January 1554 | Duke Ferdinand |

For the spouse of the heirs of the Kingdom of Naples between 1504 and 1747; see Princess of Asturias

== House of Bourbon ==
| Picture | Name | Father | Birth | Marriage | Became Duchess | Ceased to be Duchess | Death | Spouse |
|---|---|---|---|---|---|---|---|---|
| | Infanta María Isabella of Spain | Charles IV of Spain (Bourbon-Spain) | 6 July 1789 | 6 July 1802 | 12 December 1816 revival of title | 4 January 1825 became Queen | 13 September 1848 | Francis I |
| | Duchess Maria Sophie in Bavaria | Maximilian Joseph, Duke in Bavaria (Wittelsbach) | 4 October 1841 | 3 February 1859 | | 22 May 1859 became Queen | 19 January 1925 | Prince Francis |

== See also ==
- List of consorts of Naples
- List of consorts of the Two Sicilies
- Princess of Taranto
