= Bozzuto =

Bozzuto is a surname. Notable people with the surname include:

- Giovanni Bozzuto (fl. 1384–1423), Neapolitan nobleman and diplomat
- Palamede Bozzuto (fl. 1380s), Italian knight and nobleman

== See also ==
- Bozzuto Group, American real estate company
