= Charles Martel, Duke of Calabria =

Italian nobles

Charles Martel, Duke of Calabria (Italian: Carlo Martello) is a name and title shared by two short-lived heirs to the throne of the Kingdom of Naples.

== Son of Charles, Duke of Calabria ==
Charles Martel
- Born: 13 April 1327; Florence, Italy
- Died: 21 April 1327 (aged 8 days); Florence, Italy
- Burial: Basilica of Santa Croce
- House: Anjou-Naples
- Father: Charles, Duke of Calabria
- Mother: Marie of Valois

Charles Martel (13 April 1327 – 21 April 1327), was the third child and first son of Charles, Duke of Calabria, heir of Robert, King of Naples and Yolande of Aragon and his wife Marie of Valois, a niece of King Philip IV le bel of France.

At the time of his birth in Florence, his father Charles had survived his only brother Louis. The newborn prince, his sister and his father were the only living, legitimate, male-line descendants of his paternal grandfather, Robert, King of Naples. Charles also had a surviving daughter, Maria, who would die aged two in 1328. The next-in-line to the throne was Philip I, Prince of Taranto, the son of Charles II of Naples.

The young prince died only eight days after his birth, in Florence. His death left Joanna again heir to the throne. Joanna eventually became Queen of Naples — a younger sister to the Duke was born after his father died, in 1329.

== Son of Joanna I, Queen of Naples ==
Charles Martel
- Duke of Calabria
- Born: 25 December 1345; Naples, Italy
- Died: 10 May 1348 (aged 2 years, 4 months); Visegrád, Hungary
- Burial: Basilica of Székesfehérvár
- House: Anjou-Hungary
- Father: Andrew, Duke of Calabria
- Mother: Joanna I of Naples

Charles Martel, Duke of Calabria (25 December 1345 – 10 May 1348), was the only son of Joanna I of Naples, fathered by her first husband, Andrew, Duke of Calabria.

At the time of his birth in Naples, Joanna had survived her own brothers and only had a younger sister. The newborn Duke of Calabria and his mother and aunt were the only living, royal, legitimate descendants of his paternal great-grandfather, Robert, King of Naples. The heir presumptive since was Charles of Durazzo. Charles was betrothed to Joanna of Durazzo, his cousin, in 1347. In February 1348, the little Duke was transferred to Hungary.

The young Duke died only three years after his birth, in Hungary. He was buried in the Székesfehérvár Basilica.

Charles Martel, Duke of Calabria Capetian House of Anjou Cadet branch of the Capetian dynasty Born: 25 December 1345 Died: 10 May 1348
Italian nobility
Preceded by Andrew	Duke of Calabria; 25 December 1345 – 10 May 1348	Succeeded by Louis
