= Philippa of Catania =

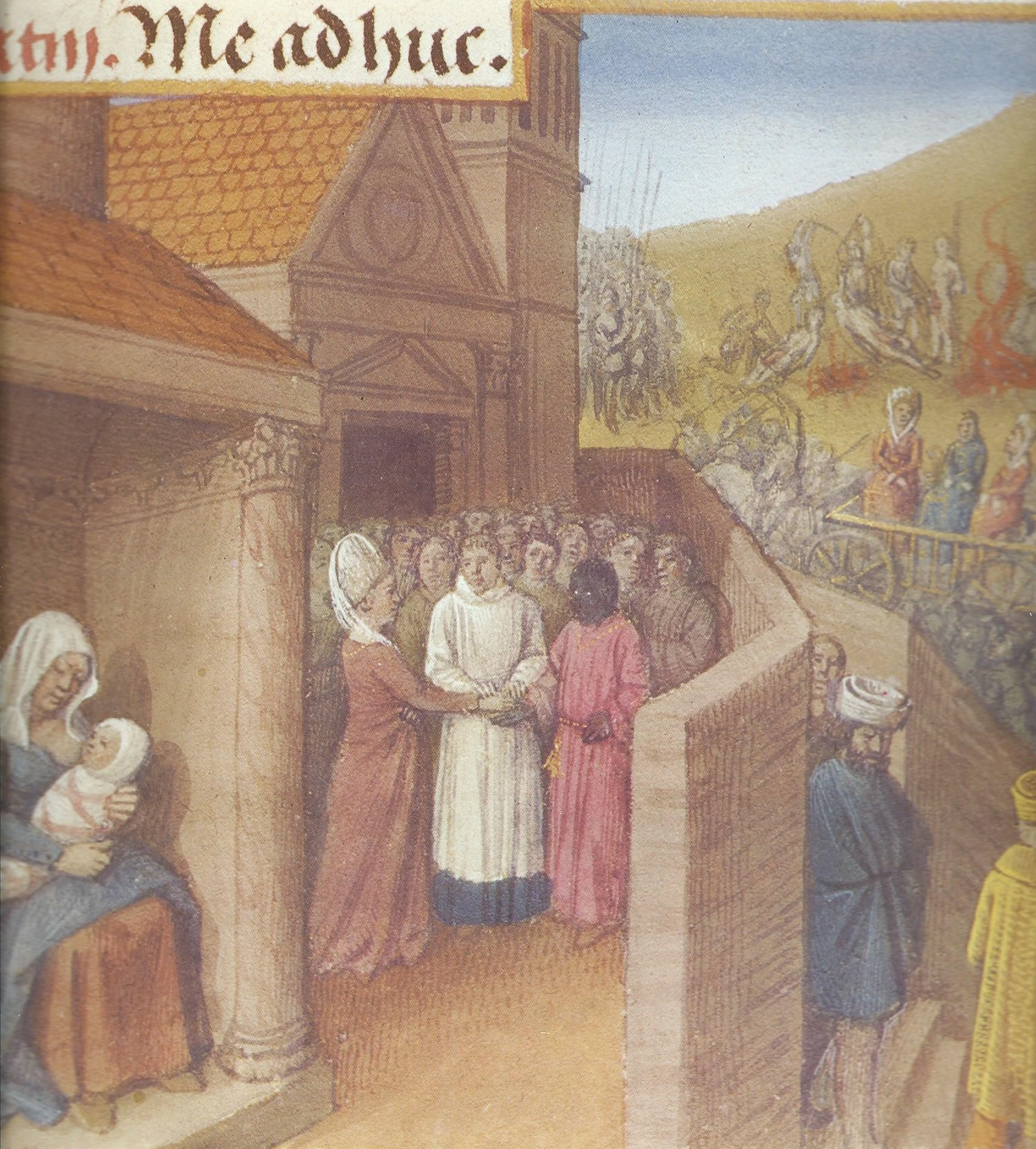
Philippa breastfeeding (left), her wedding (centre) and her torture (right, background). Painted by Jean Fouquet (1458).

Philippa of Catania, also known as Philippa the Catanian or Filippa Catanese (died in 1345), was a Sicilian woman of low birth who became an influential figure in the royal court of the Kingdom of Naples.

== Early life ==
Born in Catania, Philippa was a local fisherman's daughter. Boccaccio, who met her when she was already an elderly woman, noticed that she was "attractive in manner and appearance". She worked as a washerwoman when Robert, Duke of Calabria—son of Charles II, King of Naples—invaded Catania in 1328. His wife, Violante of Aragon, accompanied him to the military campaign. After discovering her pregnancy, Violante had to hire local staff and she chose Philippa as a wet nurse for her son, Charles. Philippa was a diligent servant, and Violante brought her back to Naples after her husband had been forced to withdraw his troops from Sicily.

== Career and fall ==
Philippa was married off to Raymond de Campagne, a former slave of Ethiopian origin. Being Charles II's favorite and a successful military commander, Raymond had become one of the wealthiest landowners in the Kingdom of Naples.

Philippa and her granddaughter, Sancia de' Cabanni, were accused of participating in the murder of Andrew, Duke of Calabria.

== Sources ==
- Casteen, Elizabeth (2015). From She-Wolf to Martyr: The Reign and Disputed Reputation of Johanna I of Naples. Cornell University Press. ISBN 978-0-8014-5386-1.
- Goldstone, Nancy (2009). The Lady Queen: The Notorious Reign of Joanna I, Queen of Naples, Jerusalem, and Sicily. Walker&Company. ISBN 978-0-8027-7770-6.
- Devisse, Jean; Mollat, Michel (1979). "The Appeal to the Ethiopian". In Bindman, David; Gates, Henry Louis Jr. (eds.). The Image of Black in Western Art, Volume II: From the Early Christian Era to the "Age of Discovery", Part 2: Africans in the Christian Ordinance of the World. Menil Foundation. pp. 83–152. ISBN 978-0-674-05258-1.
