= Duke of Calabria =

Italian nobility title

Duke of Calabria was the traditional title of the heir apparent of the Kingdom of Naples after the accession of Robert of Naples. It was also adopted by the heads of certain Houses that had once claimed the Kingdom of Naples in lieu of the royal title.

There are at present two claimants to the title of Duke of Calabria. In the Spanish context, it is the title for the head of the House of Bourbon-Two Sicilies, and in the French context it is the title for the heir to the Duke of Castro, the head of the Royal House.

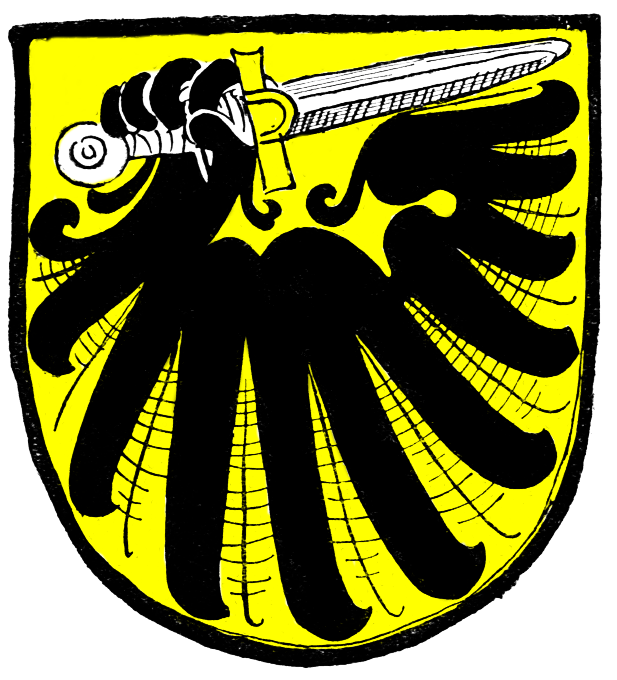
Arms of Duke of Calabria. Adlerflügel mit Schwerthand (eagle's wing with the sword hand)

== House of Angiò ==
- bef. 1297–1309: Robert, son of Charles
- 1309–1328: Charles, son of Robert
- 1333–1343: Joanna, daughter of Charles, jointly with her husband Andrew of Hungary
- 1343-1345: Andrew of Hungary, as husband of Queen Joanna I
- 1345-1348: Charles Martel, son of Andrew and Joanna I
- 1381–1382 Louis I of Naples
- 1382–1384 Louis II of Naples
- 1403–1417 Louis III of Naples
- 1426–1434 Louis III of Naples

== House of Lorraine ==
- 1434–1435 René I of Naples
- 1435–1470 John II, Duke of Lorraine
- 1470–1473 Nicholas I, Duke of Lorraine
- 1473–1481 Charles IV, Duke of Anjou
- 1481–1493 René II, Duke of Lorraine
- 1493–1544 Antoine, Duke of Lorraine
- 1544–1545 Francis I, Duke of Lorraine
- 1545–1608 Charles III, Duke of Lorraine
- 1608–1624 Henry II, Duke of Lorraine
- 1624 Francis II, Duke of Lorraine
- 1624–1634 Charles IV, Duke of Lorraine
- 1634–1661 Nicholas II, Duke of Lorraine
- 1661–1675 Charles IV, Duke of Lorraine
- 1675–1690 Charles V, Duke of Lorraine
- 1690–1729 Leopold, Duke of Lorraine
- 1729–1765 Francis I, Holy Roman Emperor
- 1765–1790 Joseph II, Holy Roman Emperor
- 1790–1792 Leopold II, Holy Roman Emperor

== House of Aragon ==
- 1458-1494 Alfonso II of Naples
- 1494–1550 Ferdinand of Aragón
- 1501–1504 Ferdinand II of Aragon

== House of Bourbon-Two Sicilies ==
Arms of Duke of Calabria as the Crown Prince of the Two Sicilies

As royal title for the heir apparent to the throne:

- 1747–1777 Infante Felipe (or Philip) (excluded from succession due to mental illness)
- 1777–1778 Prince Carlo (died as an infant in 1778)
- 1778–1825 Francis I of the Two Sicilies (title dropped on accession to the throne)
- 1825–1830 Ferdinand II of the Two Sicilies (title dropped on accession to the throne)
- 1836–1859 Francis II of the Two Sicilies (title dropped on accession to the throne)
- 1894–1934 Prince Alfonso, Count of Caserta (he never used the title)

As customary title of the head of the House:

- 1934–1960 Prince Ferdinand Pius

=== Spanish title claimants of the House of Bourbon-Two Sicilies ===
As customary title of the claimant to the headship of the House:

- 1960–1964 Infante Alfonso
- 1964–2015 Infante Carlos
- 2015–present Prince Pedro

=== French title claimants of the House of Bourbon-Two Sicilies ===
As customary title for the heir of the claimant to the headship of the House:

- 1973–2008 Prince Carlo (title dropped on succeeding his father as claimant to the headship)
- 2016–present Princess Maria Carolina

== See also ==
- List of monarchs of Sicily
- List of monarchs of Naples
- List of Counts and Dukes of Apulia and Calabria
- Scilla, Calabria
- Queen Paola of Belgium
