= Reforce d'Agoult =

Reforce d'Agoult was the Angevin seneschal of medieval Lombardy, under the reign of Joanna I of Naples. Killed in battle at Gamenario, he was replaced by Roberto di Luinardo.
