= Palamede Bozzuto =

Italian knight and nobleman

Palamede Bozzuto (Old French: Palamides Bochut; fl. 1381–1382) was an Italian knight and nobleman who took part in the wars of the succession of the Kingdom of Naples between the Angevins and the Durazzo. He was a partisan of the latter. In the Western Schism, he was a fierce supporter of Pope Urban VI.

A native of Naples, Palamede was the son of Nicola and nephew of the Archbishop Ludovico Bozzuto. His brother was Giovanni Bozzuto, captain of Bari.

At the siege of Naples in 1381, Palamede was instrumental in getting the Hungarian soldiers of Charles of Durazzo into the city on 16 July. Charles rewarded him by placing him on his council and granting him several fiefs, including Rosito, Calogenario and the castle of Muro Lucano. He also became one of the founding members of Charles' new order of knighthood, the Order of the Ship. Charles also placed Palamede in charge of his captured rival, Queen Joan I, who was locked up in Muro Lucano.

According to a letter of 1385, Palamede was a brutal jailer. He forcefully removed the queen's jewellery, dismissed most of her servants and limited her food. She was not allowed visitors and saw only Palamede, her lady-in-waiting and three servants. It is probable that he had a hand in Joan's assassination on 27 July 1382, but there is no proof. Palamede is not mentioned in any document after this.
