= Castle of Muro Lucano =

Castle in Potenza, Basilicata, Italy

Coordinates: 40.7537°N 15.4871°E

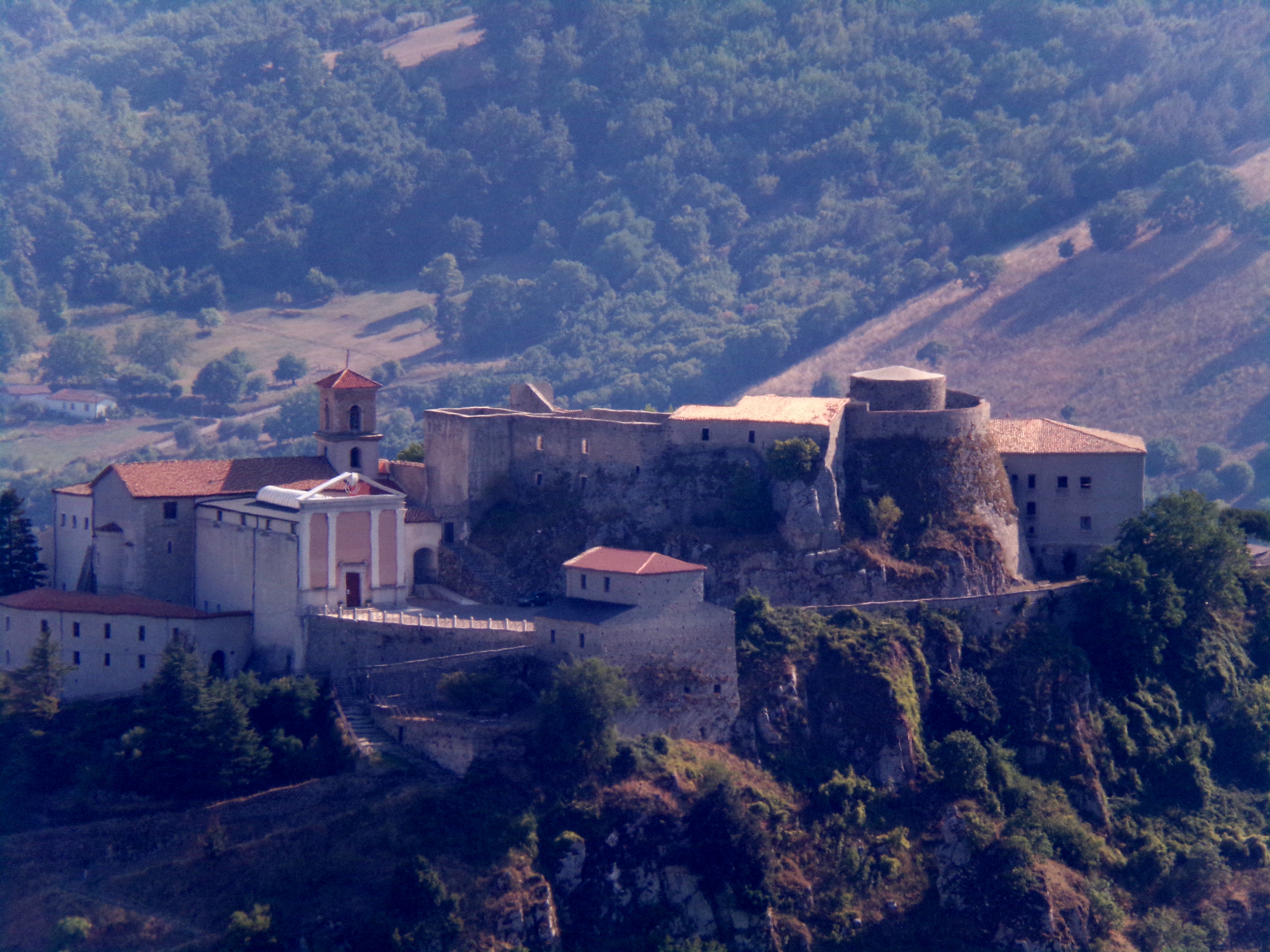
Castle of Muro Lucano

The Castle of Muro Lucano is a castle in the commune of Muro Lucano in the Potenza province of the Basilicata region of southern Italy. It was originally built in the 9th century and parts of it are still inhabited by the Martuscelli family, relatives of Francesco Domenico Lordi who bought the castle in 1830.

== History ==
- 9th century - originally built by the Lombards
- 10th century - expanded by the Angiou rulers
- 1382 - Queen of Naples, Joanna I, died at the castle allegedly assassinated by order of the King of Naples, Charles III
- 1435 - End of occupation by the Aragonese
- 1530 - enfeoffed to Ferdinando Orsini, Duke of Gravina
- 1617 - described as "characterized by two powerful towers and a narrow drawbridge"
- 1694 - damaged by an earthquake after which new parts we added and the drawbridge removed
- 1806 - the feoffment to Orsini family ended with the end of feudalism
- 1830 - sold to Francesco Domenico Lordi by Bernualdo III
- 1980 - damaged by an earthquake after which major rebuilding work took place
