= Giovanni Bozzuto =

Giovanni Bozzuto (also spelled Buzzuto), known as Giovannello (fl. 1384–1423), was a Neapolitan nobleman and diplomat who served as the captain of Bari from 1399 until 1414.

Giovanni was born into a prominent noble family at Naples in the second half of the 14th century. His brother was Palamede Bozzuto. Their father, Nicola, was a brother of the Archbishop Ludovico Bozzuto. He should not be confused with the Giovanni Bozzuto whose father was Lisolo and who was a captain under King Ladislaus and a counsellor to Queen Joan II.

Giovanni is first mentioned in 1384, when he fought in Apulia for Charles of Durazzo against Duke Louis I of Anjou, both claimants to the Neapolitan throne. In 1394, he accompanied Ladislaus, Charles's son, to Rome when he was seeking Pope Boniface IX's assistance against Louis II of Anjou. By then he held the lordship of Fratta Piccola and as such probably took part in the battle that took place between Ladislaus and Louis's forces at nearby Aversa in September 1394. In December of that year, he attended Ladislaus's general parliament.

In 1399, Giovanni was named captain of Bari after the city fell to Ladislaus. A document of 27 November 1404 indicates that he was not subject to a council or mayor. During his captaincy in Bari, he married Roberta Carofili, a local noblewoman. The couple had three sons and two daughters: Nicola, Palamede, Flaminio, Maria and Cecilia. A charter of Joan II dated to 1415 records that, for losses his lands in and around Bari suffered during the war against the Angevins, Giovanni was compensated with a wheat export licence for the duration of his life and that of his son Nicola.

In 1414, Giovanni was accused of lèse majesté and imprisoned in the castle of Bari. It is unknown when and under what circumstances he was released. According to the Diurnali of the Duke of Monteleone, in March 1420 (or 1421) Joan II sent Giovanni and two others, Francesco Orsini and Antonello Poderico, on a diplomatic mission to request the help of King Alfonso V of Aragon against Louis III of Anjou.

Giovanni is last mentioned as living in a document dated April 1423. The date of his death is unknown.
