= Marie of Valois, Duchess of Calabria =

French princess (1309–1331)

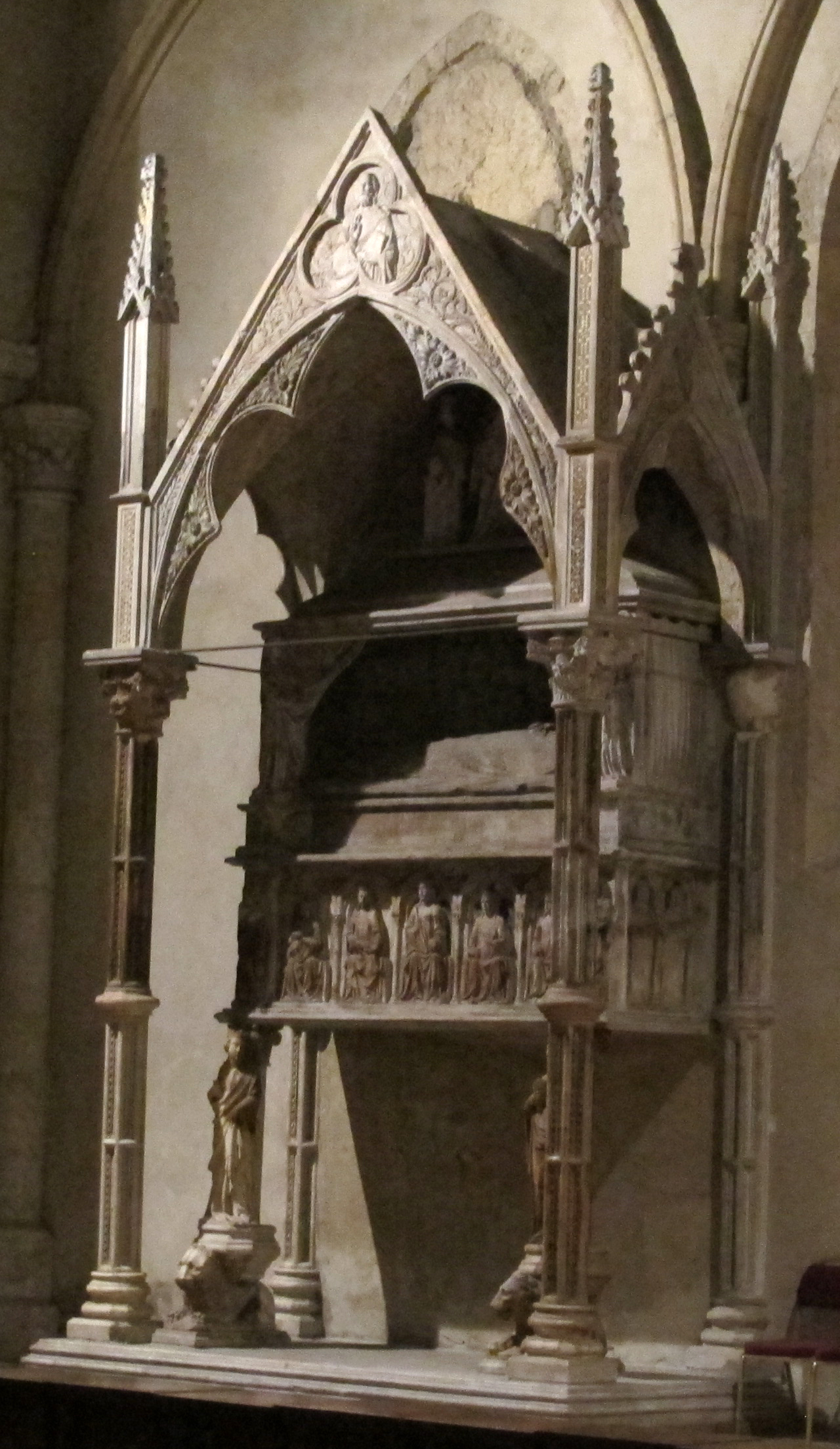
Tomb of Maria of Valois in Santa Chiara (Naples).

Marie of Valois (1309 – 23 October 1331), was the eldest daughter of Charles of Valois by his third wife Mahaut of Châtillon. She was a member of the House of Valois. One of her five children was Queen Joanna I of Naples.

== Life ==
Marie was the daughter of Charles of Valois and Mahaut of Chatillon. She married Charles, Duke of Calabria, in 1323, when she was only fourteen years of age. Charles married her after the death of his first wife, Catherine of Austria, who had died without bearing Charles any children. Marie earned the gratitude of the genteel women in Florence when she persuaded her husband to allow them to wear what they could afford.

Charles and Marie had five children:

- Eloisa (b. January or February 1325 – d. 27 December 1325).
- Maria (b. April 1326 – d. 1328).
- Charles Martel (b. Florence, 13 April 1327 – d. Florence, 21 April 1327).
- Joanna (b. Naples, March 1328 – d. castello di San Fele, 22 May 1382), Queen of Naples after succeeding her grandfather.
- Maria (b. Naples, May 1329 – d. Naples, 20 May 1366), Countess of Alba.

Her eldest surviving daughter, Joanna, became Queen of Naples. Her youngest daughter, Maria, born six months after Charles' death, became the Countess of Alba.

Marie's husband died in 1328 and she never remarried. She died in 1331 at the age of 22, during a pilgrimage to Bari. Her mother and two sisters outlived her.

== Ancestors ==
Ancestors of Marie of Valois, Duchess of Calabria

8. Louis IX of France
4. Philip III of France
9. Marguerite of Provence
2. Charles of Valois
10. James I of Aragon
5. Isabella of Aragon
11. Violant of Hungary
1. Marie of Valois
12. Guy III, Count of Saint-Pol
6. Guy IV, Count of Saint-Pol
13. Matilda of Brabant
3. Mahaut of Châtillon
14. John II, Duke of Brittany
7. Marie of Brittany
15. Beatrice of England

== Sources ==
- Casteen, Elizabeth (2015). From She-Wolf to Martyr: The Reign and Disputed Reputation of Johanna I of Naples. Cornell University Press.
- Kelly, Samantha (2003). The new Solomon: Robert of Naples (1309-1343) and Fourteenth-Century Kingship. Brill.
- Kelly, Samantha (2016). "Religious Patronage and Royal Propaganda in Angevin Naples: Santa Maria Donna Regina in context". In Elliott, Janis; Warr, Cordelia (eds.). The Church of Santa Maria Donna Regina: "Art, Iconography and Patronage in Fourteenth-Century Naples. Routledge. pp. 27–44.
- Goldstone, Nancy (2010). Joanna, The Notorious Queen of Naples, Jerusalem and Sicily. London: Weidenfeld & Nicolson. ISBN 9780297860860.
