= Yolande of Aragon, Duchess of Calabria =

Yolande of Aragon
- Infanta of Aragon

Duchess consort of Calabria
- Tenure: 23 March 1297 - August 1302
- Born: 1273; Aragon
- Died: August 1302 (aged 28–29); Termini Imerese, Palermo
- Burial: Provence-Alpes-Côte d'Azur
- Spouse: Robert, Duke of Calabria
- Issue: Charles, Duke of Calabria; Louis of Anjou
- House: Barcelona
- Father: Peter III of Aragon
- Mother: Constance II of Sicily

Yolande of Aragon (1273 – August 1302) was the daughter of Peter III of Aragon and Constance II of Sicily. She married Robert of Naples, but was never Queen of Naples since she died before her husband inherited the throne.

On 23 March 1297, in Rome, Yolande married Robert. He was the third born son of Charles II of Naples and Maria of Hungary. Robert married Yolanda in exchange for James II of Aragon's renouncing of Sicily (James was Yolanda's brother).

Yolande was then escorted to Naples by her new brother-in-law, Raymond Berengar of Andria.

Yolande and Robert had two sons:

- Charles (1298–1328), Duke of Calabria (1309), Viceroy of Naples (1318), who was the father of Queen Joanna of Naples
- Louis (1301–10)

The same month as Yolande's death was the peace of Caltabellotta, which ended the war of the Vespers. Her husband inherited the throne seven years later.

On Yolande's death, Robert married Sancha of Majorca. This marriage was childless.

== Sources ==
- Cawsey, Suzanne F. (2002). Kingship and Propaganda: Royal Eloquence and the Crown of Aragon c.1200-1450. Oxford University Press.
- Diakité, Rala I.; Sneider, Matthew T., eds. (2022). The Eleventh and Twelfth Books of Giovanni Villani's "New Chronicle". Walter de Gruyter Gmbh.
