= Joanna I of Naples =

Queen of Naples from 1343 to 1381

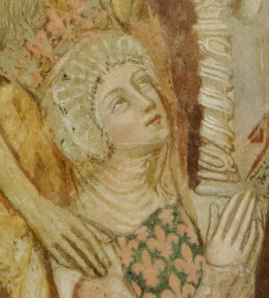
- Queen Joanna I, fresco by Niccolò di Tommaso (c. 1360)

Queen of Naples Countess of Provence and Forcalquier
- Reign: 20 January 1343 – 25 August 1381
- Coronations: 28 August 1344 (alone); 27 May 1352 (with Louis I)
- Predecessor: Robert
- Successor: Charles III
- Co-monarch: Louis I (1348–1362)
- Born: December 1325; Naples, Kingdom of Naples
- Died: 27 July 1382 (aged 56); Muro Lucano, Kingdom of Naples
- Burial: Santa Chiara Church
- Spouses: Andrew of Hungary (m. 1333; died 1345) Louis of Taranto (m. 1347; died 1362) James IV of Majorca (m. 1363; died 1375) Otto, Duke of Brunswick-Grubenhagen (m. 1376)
- Issue: Charles Martel, Duke of Calabria; Catherine of Taranto; Françoise of Taranto
- House: Anjou-Naples
- Father: Charles, Duke of Calabria
- Mother: Marie of Valois

Joanna I of Naples, also known as Johanna I (Italian: Giovanna I; December 1325 – 27 July 1382), was Queen of Naples, (Note: In reality, Joanna was crowned simply as "Queen of Sicily", despite her predecessors having lost control of the island after the War of the Sicilian Vespers. The term "Kingdom of Naples" is a simplification used since 1805 by historiography to indicate the southern end of the Italian peninsula still under the Angevin government and which at the time was known as the Kingdom of Sicily citra Pharum or al di qua del Faro (on this side of Faro) — referring to the Faro Point situated in Messina. The portion of the Kingdom that included only the island of Sicily was known as the Kingdom of Sicily ultra Farum or di la del Faro (on the other side of Faro) administered by the House of Barcelona, a government not recognized by the Anjou–Naples dynasty until the Treaty of Villeneuve, who was ratified by Joanna and King Frederick the Simple on 31 March 1373 at Aversa, in front of the papal legate, Jean de Réveillon, Bishop of Sarlat.) and Countess of Provence and Forcalquier from 1343 to 1381; she was also Princess of Achaea from 1373 to 1381.

Joanna was the eldest daughter of Charles, Duke of Calabria and Marie of Valois, Duchess of Calabria to survive infancy. Her father was the son of Robert, King of Naples, but he died before his father in 1328. Three years later, King Robert appointed Joanna as his heir and ordered his vassals to swear fealty to her. To strengthen Joanna's position, he concluded an agreement with his nephew, King Charles I of Hungary, about the marriage of Charles's younger son, Andrew, and Joanna. Charles I also wanted to secure his uncle's inheritance for Andrew, but King Robert named Joanna as his sole heir on his deathbed in 1343. He also appointed a regency council to govern his realms until Joanna's 21st birthday, but the regents could not actually take control of state administration after the King's death.

Joanna's personal life crucially affected the political stability of the Kingdom of Naples (murder of her first husband Andrew in 1345, the invasions of King Louis I of Hungary — justified as avenging the death of his brother — and her three later marriages with Louis of Taranto, James IV, titular King of Majorca and Otto, Duke of Brunswick-Grubenhagen) and undermined her position with the Holy See; moreover afterwards, during the Western Schism, she chose to support the Avignon Papacy against Pope Urban VI, who in retaliation declared her a heretic and usurper on 11 May 1380.

With all her children having predeceased her, Joanna's heirs were the descendants of her only surviving sister Maria, whose first marriage with their cousin Charles, Duke of Durazzo was performed without her permission, becoming both spouses in the heads of the political faction against Joanna. Trying to reconcile with the Durazzo branch and with the purpose of securing her succession, Joanna arranged the marriage of her niece Margaret of Durazzo with her first cousin (and Joanna's second cousin) Charles of Durazzo, who eventually captured and imprisoned Joanna, and finally ordered her assassination on 27 July 1382.

== Early years ==
Joanna I with her grandfather King Robert the Wise

Coat of arms of the House of Anjou-Naples

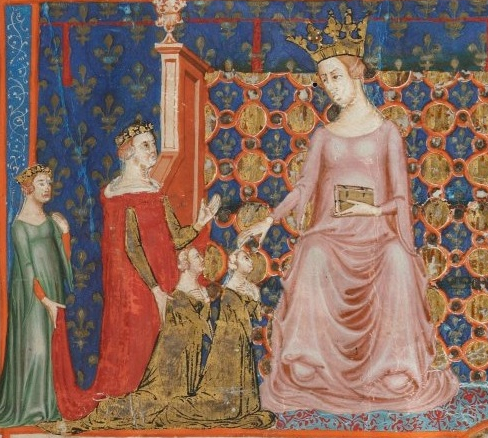
Miniature depicting Queen Sancia of Mallorca caressing her stepgranddaughters Joanna and Maria, presented to her by their mother Marie of Valois.

Joanna was the eldest surviving child of Charles, Duke of Calabria (only surviving son of Robert, King of Naples, and Marie of Valois (sister of King Philip VI of France). The Renaissance historian Donato Acciaioli claimed that she had been born in Florence, but she may have actually been born during her parents' travel towards the town, according to scholar Nancy Goldstone. The precise date of Joanna's birth is unknown; according to some researchers, she was most probably born in 1326 or 1327; however, given the fact that her mother gave birth to four or five children during her four years' marriage, Joanna was probably born in either December 1325 or early 1328. The early deaths of two of her siblings — A daughter, variously named Eloisa, Louise or Maria (born in January/February 1325; died 27 December 1325) and Charles Martel (born 13 April 1327; died eight days later) — left Joanna as the second in line to the Neapolitan throne after her own father.

Charles of Calabria died unexpectedly on 9 November 1328. With his death, his father faced the problem of succession, because Charles' posthumous child was also a daughter, Maria, born on 6 May 1329. Although Neapolitan law did not prevent women from inheriting the throne, the concept of a reigning queen was unusual. The agreement between the Holy See and Robert the Wise's grandfather, Charles I of Anjou, had explicitly acknowledged the right of Charles I's female descendants to inherit the throne, but it also stipulated that a female monarch was to marry and to allow her husband to rule. Furthermore, the Neapolitan royal house was a branch of the Capet dynasty of France and the French had recently excluded women from royal succession. Robert's nephew, Charles I of Hungary, had been disinherited in Robert's favor in 1296, but he did not abandon his claim to the Regno (or the Kingdom of Naples). Pope John XXII had ignored Charles's demands for years, but Robert's support for the Spiritual Franciscans (whom the Pope regarded as heretics) and his negligence to pay the yearly tribute to the Holy See gave rise to tensions between Naples and the Papacy. Robert's two younger brothers, Philip II, Latin Emperor, and John, Duke of Durazzo, could also claim the throne against a female monarch.

Robert was determined to secure the succession to his descendants and named Joanna and Maria as his heirs at a public ceremony at the Castel Nuovo in Naples on 4 December 1330. John of Durazzo and his wife, Agnes of Périgord, accepted Robert's decision (possibly in the hope that one of their three sons could marry Joanna), but Philip I of Taranto and his wife, Catherine of Valois, decided not to obey. When Joanna was invested with the right to succeed her grandfather on 30 November, John and Agnes were among the Neapolitan vassals who swore fealty to her, but Philip and Catherine did not attend the ceremony. Even the Pope could only persuade Philip to send a deputy to Naples to pay homage to Joanna on his behalf on 3 March 1331.

Charles I of Hungary had meanwhile asked the Pope to persuade Robert to restore the two fiefs that his father, Charles Martel, had held in the Regno—the Principality of Salerno and the Honor of Monte Sant' Angelo—to him and his sons. He also put forward a marriage alliance, asking Joanna's hand for one of his sons. The Pope supported the plan and kept urging Robert to accept it. The widowed Catherine of Valois approached her half-brother, Philip VI of France, to intervene and block the marriage. She proposed her sons, Robert, Prince of Taranto and Louis, as suitable husbands for Joanna and Maria. The Pope was resolute and issued a bull on 30 June 1331, ordering that Joanna and her sister were to marry Charles I's sons. Initially, Charles I's eldest son, Louis, was designated for husband to Joanna. His younger brother, Andrew, was only Louis's substitute in case of his premature death. At one point during the negotiations, Charles I changed his decision and appointed Andrew to marry Joanna.

After Marie of Valois died during a pilgrimage to Bari in 1332, Robert's second wife (Joanna's stepgrandmother), Sancia of Majorca, assumed responsibility for her daughters' education. Queen Sancia, a fervent patron of the Spiritual Franciscans, lived like a Clarisse nun, although the Pope had refused to annul her marriage to King Robert. Joanna and Maria's nurse, Philippa of Catania, exercised an even greater influence on their education, and became a sort of second mother for the orphaned princesses. Sancia and Philippa were the most influential personalities in the court of Robert who did not make decisions without their consent, according to Boccaccio.

Raised in the cultured and refined court of her grandfather, Joanna apparently received no formal education or, if she did, was not very accurate, given that the Angevin documents do not mention the names of her tutors. She probably studied the books in the royal library, which contained the writings of Titus Livius, Paolo da Perugia, Saint Gregory and Marco Polo. However, it seems that when she reached adulthood she was able to express herself in Latin (as her remaining letters could prove (Note: In contrast to the theory of Émile-Guillaume Léonard, who considered Joanna an illiterate because she defined herself as "a woman with little instruction in letters so for this reason she was frequently deceived" in a letter to Pope Clement VI in 1346, according to Mario Gaglione, it would be only a rhetorical phrase. Nancy Goldstone argues that Sancia of Majorca also defined herself in a similar way and was able to write, so she believes that Joanna knew how to do the same. The unclean Latin in the Queen's letters would indicate that she had written it in her own hand.)), French, Italian and Provençal. The chronicler Domenico da Gravina affirms that both Joanna and her sister Maria had been "informed of every art and virtue by the same Lord King Robert and by Queen Sancia".

Charles I of Hungary came personally to Naples to complete the negotiations with his uncle about the marriage of Joanna and Andrew in the summer of 1333. He had not spared money during the journey, because he wanted to demonstrate his wealth and power. The two kings came to terms after further negotiations. According to the agreement, Andrew and Joanna were engaged, but Robert and Charles I also stipulated that Andrew was to marry Maria if he outlived Joanna and one of Charles I's surviving sons—Louis or Stephen—should marry Joanna if Andrew died before her. The marriage contract was ceremoniously signed on 26 September. Next day, Robert invested Joanna and Andrew with the Duchy of Calabria and the Principality of Salerno. The Pope granted the necessary dispensations for the marriages in November 1333. The marriage remained unconsummated for years, most probably because of Andrew's immaturity, but it gave rise to conflicts between the different branches of the House of Anjou.

Andrew grew up in Naples, but he and his Hungarian retainers were regarded as foreigners. His cousins (the sons of Philip of Taranto and John of Durazzo), and even Joanna often made fun of him. Both contemporaneous and later authors were convinced that King Robert initially wanted to appoint Andrew as his successor. For instance, Giovanni Villani, claimed that the King "wanted his nephew, son of the King of Hungary, to succeed him after his death". However, miniatures of the Anjou Bible depict only Joanna wearing a crown in the late 1330s. Since the King had commissioned it, the pictures suggests that he had decided to ignore Andrew's claim to the throne. Indeed, in his last will, he named Joanna as his sole heir to Naples, Provence, Forcalquier and Piedmont, and also bequeathed his claim to the Kingdom of Jerusalem to her. He also stipulated that Maria was to inherit Joanna's realms if she died childless. King Robert did not order Andrew's coronation, thus excluding him from the administration of Naples. The dying king also set up a regency council, consisting of his most trusted advisors — the Vice-Chancellor Philippe de Cabassoles, Bishop of Cavaillon, Fillipo di Sanginetto, great seneschal of Provence, and Admiral Giffredo di Marzano — and headed by Sancia. He ordered that Joanna could only start to rule alone after her 21st birthday, ignoring customary law which established 18 as the age of majority.

== Reign ==
=== Accession ===
King Robert died on 20 January 1343, at the age of 67, after 34 years as king of Naples. Two days later, Andrew was knighted and his marriage to Joanna was consummated in accordance with the late king's last wishes. Thereafter, they mainly met with each other only at important state and religious ceremonies. Otherwise, they went to separate churches, they visited separate places and Joanna even forbade her husband to enter her bedchamber without her permission. The fifteen-year-old Andrew did not have his own treasury and Joanna's courtiers controlled his daily spending.

When writing about the political situation in the Regno after Robert's death, Petrarch described Joanna and Andrew as "two lambs entrusted to the care of a multitude of wolves, and I see a kingdom without a king". Most political factors resented the establishment of the regency council. Joanna approached Pope Clement VI and asked him to grant the title of king to her husband, most probably because she wanted to secure the Hungarian Angevins' support to shorten the term of her minority. The Pope regarded the establishment of the regency council as a usurpation of his sovereign rights, but he wanted to control the administration of Naples. He rejected Joanna's proposal, but he rarely addressed letters directly to the council.

Agnes of Périgord wanted to secure the marriage of Joanna's sister Maria to her eldest son, Charles of Durazzo. The Dowager Queen Sancia and Joanna supported her plan, but they knew that Catherine of Valois would oppose the marriage. Agnes's brother, Hélie de Talleyrand-Périgord, was the most influential cardinal at the Pope's court in Avignon. He persuaded Clement VI to issue a papal bull on 26 February 1343, authorizing Charles of Durazzo to marry any woman. In possession of the bull, Maria was engaged to Charles of Durazzo in the presence of Joanna, Sancia and other members of the regency council at Castel Nuovo on 26 March. The betrothal outraged Catherine of Valois who appealed to King Philip VI of France and the Pope, demanding them to achieve its annulment. Two days after the betrothal, Charles of Durazzo abducted Maria to his castle where a priest secretly married them and the marriage was soon consummated.

Catherine of Valois's second son, Louis of Taranto, invaded Charles of Durazzo's domains. Charles of Durazzo gathered his troops to secure the defence of his estates. Her sister's secret marriage infuriated Joanna and she sent letters to the Pope demanding the annulment of the marriage. Pope Clement VI refused and commanded Cardinal Talleyrand-Périgord to send an envoy to Naples to mediate a compromise. The cardinal's emissary persuaded the parties to sign an agreement on 14 July 1343. The legitimacy of Charles and Maria's marriage was acknowledged, but Catherine of Valois and her sons received cash settlement from the royal treasury. Joanna lost confidence both in her sister and in the Durazzo branch of her family and started to promote the career of her most trusted retainers, including Philippa of Catania's son, Roberto de' Cabanni, and her illegitimate uncle, Charles d'Artois.

=== Conflicts ===
Andrew's Hungarian retainers informed his mother, Elizabeth of Poland, about Andrew's uncertain position. She and her eldest son, Louis I of Hungary, sent envoys to Avignon, urging the Pope to order Andrew's coronation. She also decided to visit the Regno to strengthen Andrew's position. Before departing from Hungary, Queen Elizabeth collected 21,000 marks of gold and 72,000 marks of silver from the Hungarian treasury, because she was ready to spend a large amount of money to buy the support of the Holy See and the Neapolitan aristocrats for her son. She and her retinue landed at Manfredonia in the summer of 1343. She and her son met at Benevento, but Joanna received her only days later at Somma Vesuviana. When meeting with her mother-in-law, Joanna was wearing her crown to emphasize her royal status.

Queen Elizabeth and her retinue entered Naples on 25 July. She first approached Joanna's stepgrandmother, but the ailing Sancia of Majorca did not interfere in favor of Andrew. Joanna did not openly oppose her husband's coronation, but her mother-in-law soon realized that she only applied delaying tactics. Queen Elizabeth left Naples for Rome and sent envoys to Avignon, urging the Pope to sanction Andrew's coronation. Petrarch, who visited Naples in October as Cardinal Giovanni Colonna's envoy, experienced that the kingdom had moved towards anarchy after King Robert's death. He recorded that bands of bullying noblemen terrorized the people during the nights and gladiator games were regularly held in the presence of Joanna and Andrew. He also claimed that a hypocrite Franciscan friar, Fra' Roberto, controlled the regency council, describing him as a "terrible three-footed beast, with its feet naked, with its head bare, arrogant about its poverty, dripping with pleasure."

Petrarch wanted to achieve the liberation of Colonna's relatives, the Pipini brothers, who had been imprisoned for various crimes in 1341. Their property was distributed among various members of the royal family and the Neapolitan aristocracy and Petrarch could persuade the regency council to grant an amnesty to them. Queen Elizabeth, who was still staying in Rome, realized that the conflict between the influential cardinal and the Neapolitan leaders gave an opportunity to strengthen her son's position. Andrew took sides with the Pipini and promised to achieve their liberation. Petrarch's reports from Naples convinced the Pope that the regency council could not administer the kingdom effectively. Emphasizing that Joanna was still a minor, the Pope appointed Cardinal Aymery de Châlus as his legate and charged him with the government of the Regno in a bull on 28 November 1343. Joanna's envoys made several efforts to delay the papal legate's departure from Avignon.

The negotiations between her mother-in-law and the Holy See alarmed Joanna and she asked the Pope in a letter on 1 December to stop discussing Neapolitan issues with the Hungarian envoys. The Pope addressed Andrew as the "illustrious king of Sicily" and urged his coronation in a letter on 19 January 1344, but he soon emphasized Joanna's hereditary right to rule. Five days later, Joanna urged the Pope to withdraw his legate and to authorize her to rule alone. The Pope soon responded, declaring that Joanna would alone rule the kingdom "just as if she were a man" even after she and her husband were jointly crowned. Around the same time, Queen Elizabeth returned to Naples and Andrew's courtiers informed her that they had learnt of plots against Andrew's life. She decided to take her son back to Hungary, but Joanna, Agnes of Périgord and Catherine of Valois jointly dissuaded her. Joanna and her grandaunts most probably feared that Andrew would return from Hungary to Naples accompanied by Hungarian troops. Queen Elizabeth departed from Italy on 25 February, leaving her son behind. The Angevins' northern Italian enemies took advantage of the weakened position of the Regno. John II, Marquess of Montferrat and the Visconti of Milan captured Alessandria and Asti in Piedmont and continued their military campaign against other Piedmontese towns that acknowledged Joanna's sovereignty. They forced Tortona, Bra and Alba into submission in 1344.

Joanna started distributing large parcels of the royal domains to her most trusted supporters, among them Roberto de' Cabanni, who was rumoured to be her lover. Joanna's donations outraged the Pope who started to hint that he was ready to strengthen Andrew's role in state administration. The Pope also ordered Aymery de Châlus to move to Naples without any delay. Chalus reached Naples on 20 May 1344. Joanna wanted to swear fealty to the Pope alone in a private ceremony, but the papal legate resisted her demands. Joanna had to take the oath of obedience along with her husband in a public ceremony. Joanna fell sick and her illness enabled Andrew to achieve the Pipini brothers' liberation, but his act outraged other Neapolitan aristocrats. On 28 August, the papal legate formally recognized Joanna as the legitimate heir to Naples, but she had to acknowledge the papal legate's right to administer the kingdom. Chalus dissolved the regency council and appointed new officials to govern the provinces. However, the royal officials ignored the legate's orders and Joanna refused to pay the yearly tribute to the Holy See, saying that she had been deprived of the Regno.

Cardinal Talleyrand-Périgord and Joanna's envoy, Louis of Durazzo, urged Pope Clement VI to dismiss his legate who was also willing to abdicate. After King Philip VI intervened against the legate, the Pope decided to recall him, declaring that the 18-year-old Joanna had matured under the legate's auspices in December 1344. In February 1345, the Pope issued a bull, forbidding Joanna's most trusted advisors—Philippa of Catania and her relatives—to intervene in politics, but he also replaced Chalus with Guillaume Lamy, Bishop of Chartres. To placate the Pope, Joanna decided to conciliate Andrew and their conjugal union was restored. Before long, she became pregnant.

Joanna had meanwhile instructed Reforce d'Agoult, Senechal of Provence, to invade Piedmont. The burghers of Chieri and James of Savoy-Achaea joined the Provençal army. They reoccupied Alba in the spring, but John II of Montferrat and the Visconti gathered their troops near Chieri and defeated Agoult's army in the Battle of Gamenario on 23 April. Agoult died fighting in the battlefield and Chieri surrendered to the victors.

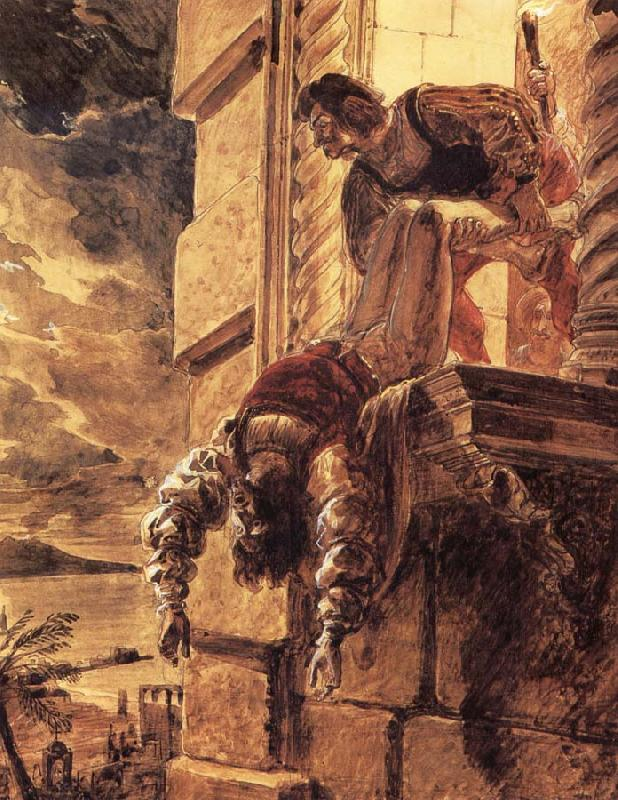
Murder of Andrew, Duke of Calabria, painted by Karl Briullov.

The relationship between Joanna and the Pope became tense because she again started to alienate royal estates and ignored the Pope's proposals. On 10 June, Clement VI urged her to stop obstructing Andrew's coronation, but she was determined to exclude her husband from state administration. She answered that she was in the best position to look after her husband's interests, implying that her "understanding of gender roles within her marriage" was atypical, according to historian Elizabeth Casteen. On 9 July, the Pope announced that he would excommunicate her if she continued to give away royal estates. Queen Sancia died on 28 July. Before long, Joanna abandoned her husband. Rumours about a love affair between Joanna and Louis of Taranto started to spread in Naples, but her unfaithfulness was never proven. Pope Clement VI decided to achieve Andrew's coronation and charged Cardinal Chalus with performing the ceremony.

Hearing of the Pope's reversal, a group of noble conspirators determined to forestall Andrew's coronation. During a hunting trip at Aversa in 1345, Andrew left his room in the middle of the night from 18 to 19 September and was set upon by the conspirators. A treacherous servant barred the door behind him; and with Joanna in her own bedroom, a terrible struggle ensued, Andrew defending himself furiously and shrieking for aid. He was finally overpowered, strangled with a cord, and flung from a window with a rope tied to his genitals. Isolde, Andrew's Hungarian nurse, heard his cries, and with her own screams chased the murderers off. She took the Prince's corpse to the church of the monks and remained with it until next morning in mourning. When the Hungarian knights arrived she told them everything in their mother tongue so no one else would learn about the truth, and soon they left Naples, telling everything to the Hungarian King. Opinions are divided on the real involvement of the Queen in the assassination. For some, she was the instigator of the murder; for others, like Émile-Guillaume Léonard, Joanna's involvement has not been demonstrated.

Joanna informed the Papacy, as well as other states in Europe of the murder, expressing her disgust in letters, but her inner circle of friends were thought to be most suspect. On 25 December 1345, she gave birth to a son, Charles Martel, Andrew's posthumous child. The infant was proclaimed Duke of Calabria and Prince of Salerno on 11 December 1346 as heir of the Kingdom of Naples.

=== Murder and wars ===
When Joanna took the throne, several lords in northern Italy saw this as an opportunity to expand their territory at her expense. In 1344 John II, Marquess of Montferrat led attacks which conquered her cities of Alessandria, Asti, Tortona, Bra, and Alba. She sent her seneschal, Reforce d'Agoult, to deal with it. He engaged the invaders on 23 April 1345 at the Battle of Gamenario, but was soundly defeated and killed.

Montferrat then went on to capture Chieri, within the lands of James of Piedmont, who had supported Joanna. James called for help from his cousin and lord, Amadeus VI, Count of Savoy in 1347. Together, they drove back the attackers through that July. John then added more forces to his alliance, bringing in Thomas II, Marquess of Saluzzo and Humbert II of Viennois. Together, they captured nearly all of Joanna's lands in the region.

When she made public her plans to marry one of her Taranto cousins and not Andrew's younger brother Stephen, the Hungarians openly accused her of the murder.

Louis of Taranto was a seasoned warrior, who understood Neapolitan politics from his lifetime experiences, raised at the court of Catherine of Valois, Joanna's aunt. After Joanna stated her intention to marry him, his brother Robert banded together with his cousin (and erstwhile rival) Charles of Durazzo against them. Some of Joanna's courtiers and servants were tortured and later executed, including her Sicilian governess Philippa of Catania and the latter's family. Louis was successful in driving his brother's forces back, but just as he reached Naples, it became known that the Hungarians planned to invade. Joanna made a pact with the Kingdom of Sicily, preventing them from invading at the same time. She married Louis on 22 August 1347, without seeking the necessary Papal dispensation, because of their being closely related.

In anticipation of his marriage, Louis was made Joint-Protector and Defender of the Kingdom (1 May 1347), jointly with Charles of Durazzo. One month later (20 June), Louis was made Vicar-General of the Kingdom. The marriage caused the Queen's popularity within her own Kingdom to fall.

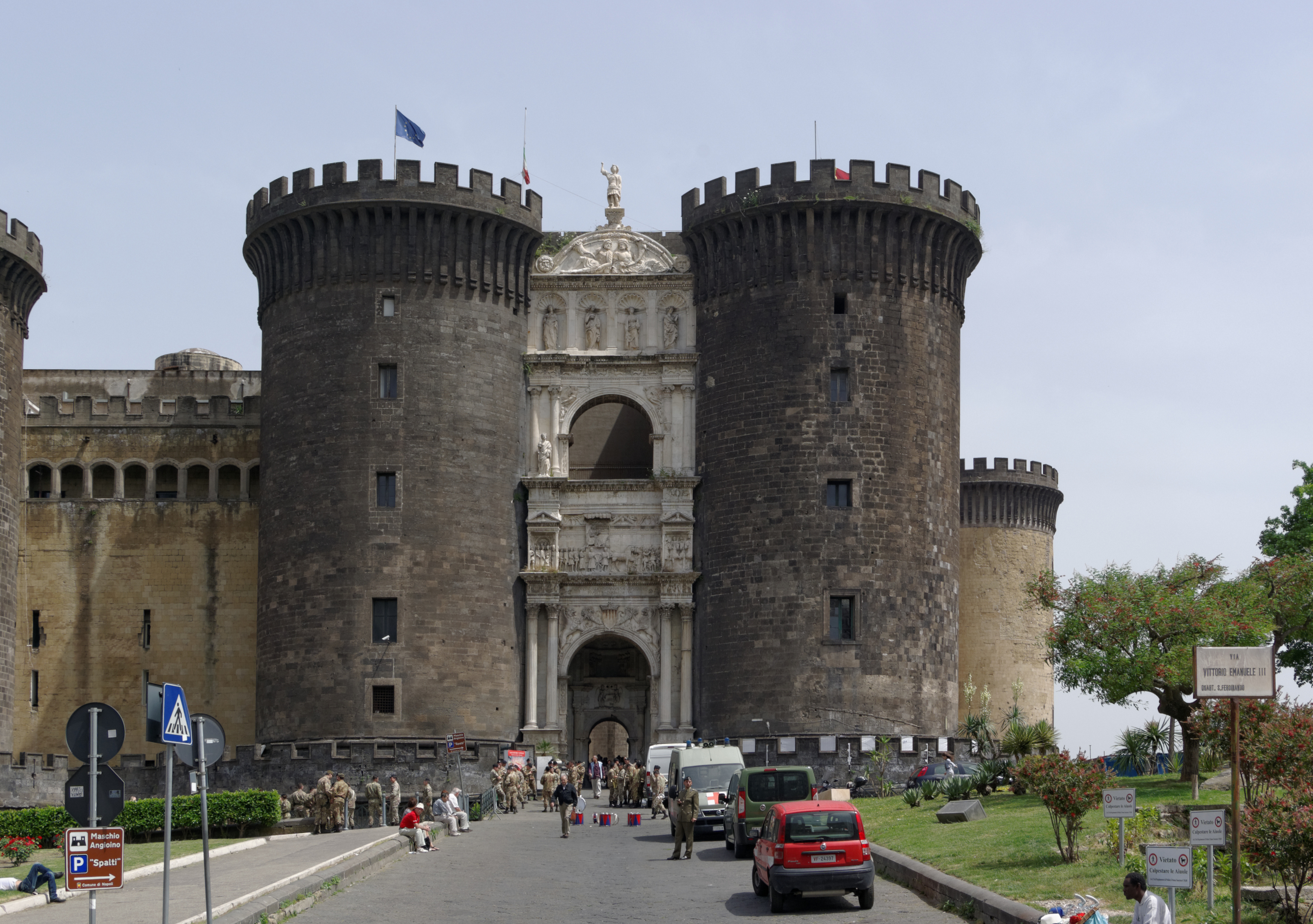
Castel Nuovo in Naples.

Louis the Great, Andrew's older brother, took this opportunity to seek the annexation of the Kingdom of Naples. He launched a military expedition and the first troops made their entrance to L'Aquila on 10 May 1347.

On 11 January 1348, the Hungarian troops were at Benevento ready to invade the Kingdom of Naples. Faced with this threat, Joanna, who had retired at Castel Nuovo and trusted the loyalty of Marseille, prepared her escape from the vengeance of Louis. Without waiting for the return of her husband, she embarked on 15 January 1348 on two galleys –property of the Marseille citizen Jacques de Gaubert– to Provence, taking with her the still devoted Enrico Caracciolo. Louis of Taranto arrived in Naples the next day and escaped in another galley.

After easily taking the city of Naples, Louis the Great ordered the execution of Charles of Durazzo, Joanna's cousin and brother-in-law: he was beheaded on 23 January 1348 in the same place where Louis' brother Andrew was murdered. Joanna and Andrew's son, Charles Martel (betrothed to Charles of Durazzo's eldest daughter), who was left behind by his mother, was sent by his uncle to Visegrád in the Kingdom of Hungary, where he died after 10 May 1348, aged 2.

After a stop-over in the Fort de Brégançon, Joanna arrived in Marseille on 20 January 1348, where she received a warm welcome. She swore to observe the privileges of the city and received the oath of allegiance of its inhabitants. She signed the letters patent that united the upper and lower towns, ensuring the administrative unit. She then went to Aix-en-Provence, where her reception was very different; the Provençal barons clearly demonstrated their hostility to her. She had to take an oath to do nothing against Provence and to appoint only locals in the county posts.

Joanna arrived in Avignon on 15 March, to have a personal meeting with the Pope. Louis of Taranto joined her in Aigues-Mortes, and the couple was received by Clement VI. Joanna's visit had a triple purpose: to obtain a dispensation for her marriage to Louis of Taranto, to receive the absolution or exoneration of Andrew's murder and to prepare the reconquest of her Kingdom. The Pope granted the couple the dispensation, appointed a commission to investigate the charges of involvement in the murder of Andrew and bought the city of Avignon for 80,000 florins, which became effectively separate from Provence. Eventually, Joanna was exonerated for the crime by the Pope. During her stay in Avignon, by the end of June, Joanna gave birth to her second child and first-born from her marriage with Louis of Taranto, a daughter called Catherine.

Having learned that Louis the Great abandoned Naples after the outbreak of the Black Death, Joanna, with her husband and newborn daughter, left Avignon on 21 July and stayed in Marseille during 24–28 July, then moved to Sanary-sur-Mer on 30 July, then to the Fort de Brégançon on 31 July and finally arrived in Naples on 17 August 1348. One month after her arrival, she broke her previous promises on 20 September by removing Raymond d'Agoult from his post of Seneschal and appointing in his place the Neapolitan Giovanni Barrili. The public discontent forced Joanna to restore d'Agoult in his post.

Over time, the Hungarians came to be viewed as barbarians by the Neapolitan people, including Giovanni Boccaccio (who described Louis the Great as “’rabid’ and ‘more vicious than a snake’”), so it was easy for the Queen and her husband to gain popularity after their return.

=== Louis of Taranto ===
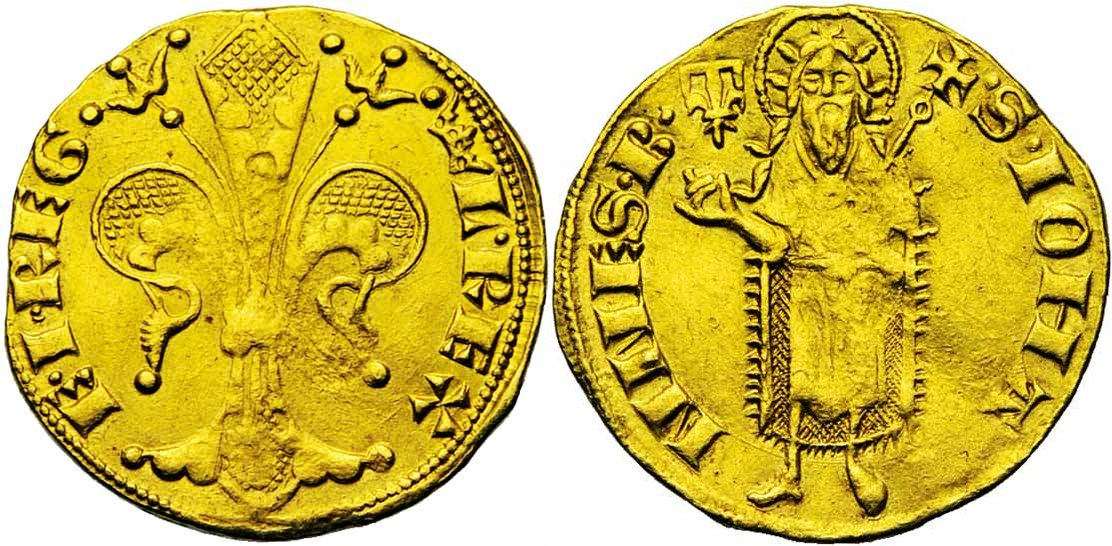
Provençal coin of "King Louis and Queen Joanna" (L· REX- E· I· REG), struck between 1349 and 1362.

On 18 August 1348, Louis, with the queen's consent, assumed the title of King of Jerusalem and Sicily, obviously without the pope's approval. From early 1349 onwards, all documents for the Kingdom were issued in the names of both husband and wife, and Louis was indisputably in control of military fortresses. On coins issued during their joint reign, Louis' name always preceded Joanna's. Although he was not officially recognised by Pope Clement VI as king and co-ruler until 1352, Neapolitans likely considered him their monarch from the moment he started acting as such.

Louis took advantage of the turmoil caused by yet another Hungarian attack to wrest complete royal authority from his wife. He purged the court of her supporters, and struck down her favourite, Enrico Caracciolo, whom he accused of adultery in April 1349 and very likely had executed. Two months later, on 8 June 1349, Catherine, Joanna and Louis' daughter, died aged 1.

After another Hungarian offensive which led to the walls of Naples in 1350, Pope Clement VI sent a Legate, Raymond Saquet, Bishop of Saint-Omer, with a fleet commanded by Hugues des Baux. Following this, Louis of Taranto promised to respect Joanna's independence. Shortly after, Louis the Great, seriously injured, returned to his country.

In October 1351, Joanna gave birth to her second child with Louis, another daughter, Françoise. Five months later, on 23 March 1352, Louis received Pope Clement VI's formal recognition as his wife's co-ruler in all her realms. On 27 May, Louis was crowned with her by the Archbishop of Braga in the Hotel di Taranto in Naples. A few days later, on 2 June, Françoise, by then the couple's only surviving child, died aged 8 months.

In 1356 Louis and Joanna organized the reconquest of Sicily. They formally entered Messina on 24 December 1356 after the victory of Niccolò Acciaioli, only to be forced to leave again after a serious naval defeat by the Catalans (29 June 1357) at Acireale.

At the same time, the troops of mercenary Arnaud de Cervole (called the Archpriest), crossed the Durance on 13 July 1357 and plundered Provence. Philip II of Taranto, Louis' brother (and third husband of Joanna's sister Maria since April 1355), was sent to Provence as Vicar General to fight against the forces that ravaged Provence. He bought the support of the troops of the Count of Armagnac which also showed daunting for local people. Finally Pope Innocent VI obtained the discharge of these bands with payments.

Louis of Taranto, who caught a cold while bathing, fell ill. His condition worsened over the course of a month and he died on 25 May 1362.

=== Personal rule ===
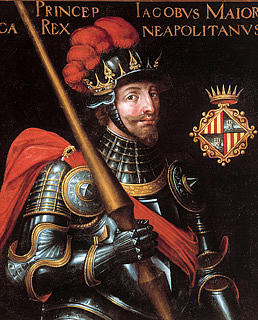
James IV of Majorca

The death of Louis of Taranto, a brutal and authoritarian husband, finally gave Joanna the opportunity to take back the power she had been denied. During the next three years, the Queen would take a series of measures that made her popular: she granted a pardon to Raymond des Baux on 20 March 1363, replaced Roger of San Severino by Fouques d'Agoult as Seneschal of Provence, and promulgated various edicts to prevent internal disorders.

On 14 December 1362, Joanna contracted by proxy her third marriage, with James IV, titular King of Majorca and Prince of Achaea, who was ten years her junior. The wedding took place in person five months later, in May 1363 at Castel Nuovo. Unfortunately, this marriage was also turbulent: her new husband had been imprisoned for almost 14 years by his uncle King Peter IV of Aragon in an iron cage, an experience which left him mentally deranged. In addition to his poor mental state, another bone of contention between the couple was James IV's efforts to be involved in the government, although he was excluded from any role in the government of Naples in his marriage contract. Despite her marital troubles, in January 1365 Joanna was found to be pregnant with James IV's child, but unfortunately in June she had a miscarriage, as was noted in a letter of condolence sent to her by Pope Urban V dated 19 July 1365. She never conceived again.

Without hope of being King of Naples, James IV left Naples for Spain by the end of January 1366 and made an unsuccessful attempt to recapture Majorca. He was captured by King Henry II of Castile, who transferred him to Bertrand du Guesclin, who held him captive in Montpellier. He was ransomed by Joanna in 1370 and returned to her briefly, only to depart again, this time for good. He failed in an attempt to recapture Roussillon and Cerdanya in 1375, and fled to Castile where he died of illness or poison at Soria in February 1375.

To assert the rights of the Holy Roman Empire over the Kingdom of Arles, Charles IV, Holy Roman Emperor and King of Bohemia crossed Avignon, and was crowned on 4 June 1365 as King of Arles at the Church of St. Trophime, but guaranteed the rights of Joanna over Provence.

Louis I, Duke of Anjou, brother of King Charles V of France and Lieutenant of Languedoc, asserted a claim to Provence. With the help of the armies of Bertrand du Guesclin, he launched an attack. Avignon was ransomed, Arles and Tarascon were besieged, but while the first was captured, the latter was saved by Provençal troops after nineteen days of unsuccessful siege. The troops of Seneschal Raymond II d'Agoult were defeated at Céreste. The intervention of both Pope Urban V and King Charles V, as well the excommunication against du Guesclin on 1 September 1368, caused the retreat of the latter and the signing of a peace Treaty on 13 April 1369, which was followed by a truce signed on 2 January 1370.

After these periods of unrest, Joanna experienced a period of relative calm, thanks to her good relations with the Holy See under Popes Urban V and Gregory XI. Elzéar of Sabran was canonized in 1371. Bridget of Sweden visited Naples in 1372. Through the mediation of Gregory XI, the final peace treaty with Louis I of Anjou was signed on 11 April 1371, under which he gave up his claim over Tarascon. In addition, the Queen recovered her domains in Piedmont thanks to the success of the condottiero Otto of Brunswick, with whom she later married.

By the Treaty of Villeneuve (1372), Joanna officially recognised as permanent the loss of Sicily, suffered ninety years earlier in 1282. Joanna then immersed herself fully in the running of her kingdom and enjoyed every aspect of government. Although she was a fair and judicious ruler, no law or edict, however minor, was ever carried out without her personal approval and seal. Joanna's reign was also marked by her support and protection of local businesses, the creation of new industries, and her refusal to debase the currency. Crime was greatly reduced and she was an ardent promoter of peace within her vast realm.

Despite the Queen's deep spirituality and friendships with Catherine of Siena and Bridget of Sweden, her court was notable for its extravagance, with her collection of exotic animals and servants of various origins including Turkish, Saracen, and African.

The contemporary writer Giovanni Boccaccio has left us with the following description of Queen Joanna in his De mulieribus claris: "Joanna, queen of Sicily and Jerusalem, is more renowned than other woman of her time for lineage, power, and character". Extant images reveal her to have been blonde-haired and fair-skinned.

=== Western Schism ===
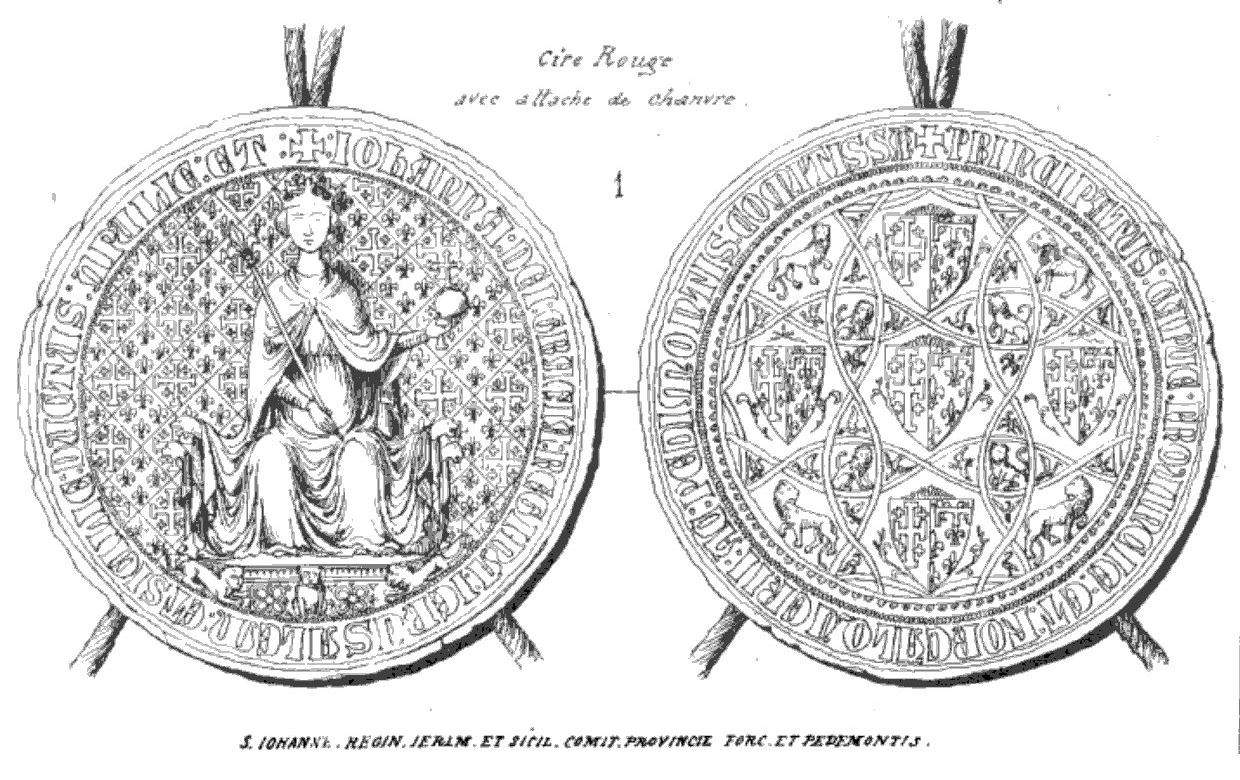
Queen Joanna's personal Seal

Without surviving children, Joanna sought a solution to her succession by arranging the marriage in January 1369 between her niece Margaret of Durazzo (youngest daughter of her sister Maria and her first husband Charles, Duke of Durazzo), and her first-cousin Charles of Durazzo (in turn Joanna's second cousin; son of Louis, Count of Gravina). This wedding was opposed by her former brother-in-law and Margaret's stepfather Philip II, Prince of Taranto. During a near-fatal illness in November 1373, he bequeathed his claims to his brother-in-law Francis of Baux, Duke of Andria, and his son James. Francis laid claim by force to the rights of Philip II, which Joanna had reverted to the crown. Joanna then confiscated his property by grounds of lèse-majesté on 8 April 1374.

Joanna was now determined to undermine the position of Charles of Durazzo as a potential heir. Indeed, with the approval of Pope Gregory XI, on 25 December 1375, she signed her fourth marriage contract, with Otto, Duke of Brunswick-Grubenhagen, who valiantly defended her rights in Piedmont. The wedding in person took place three months later, on 25 March 1376 at Castel Nuovo. Although the new husband was reduced to the status of Prince consort, Charles of Durazzo was irritated by this union and approached Louis the Great of Hungary, Joanna's enemy.

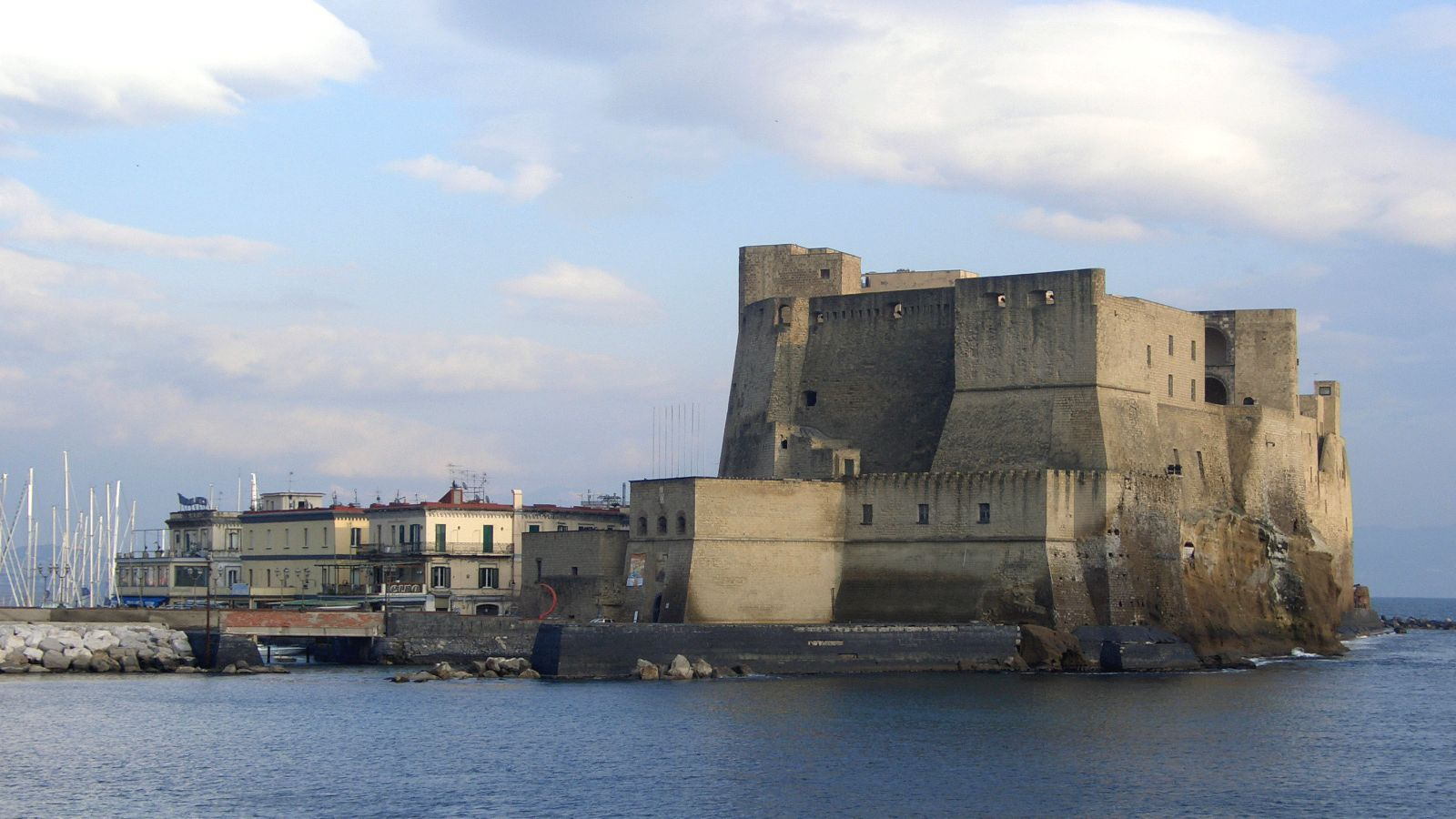
Castel dell'Ovo in Naples

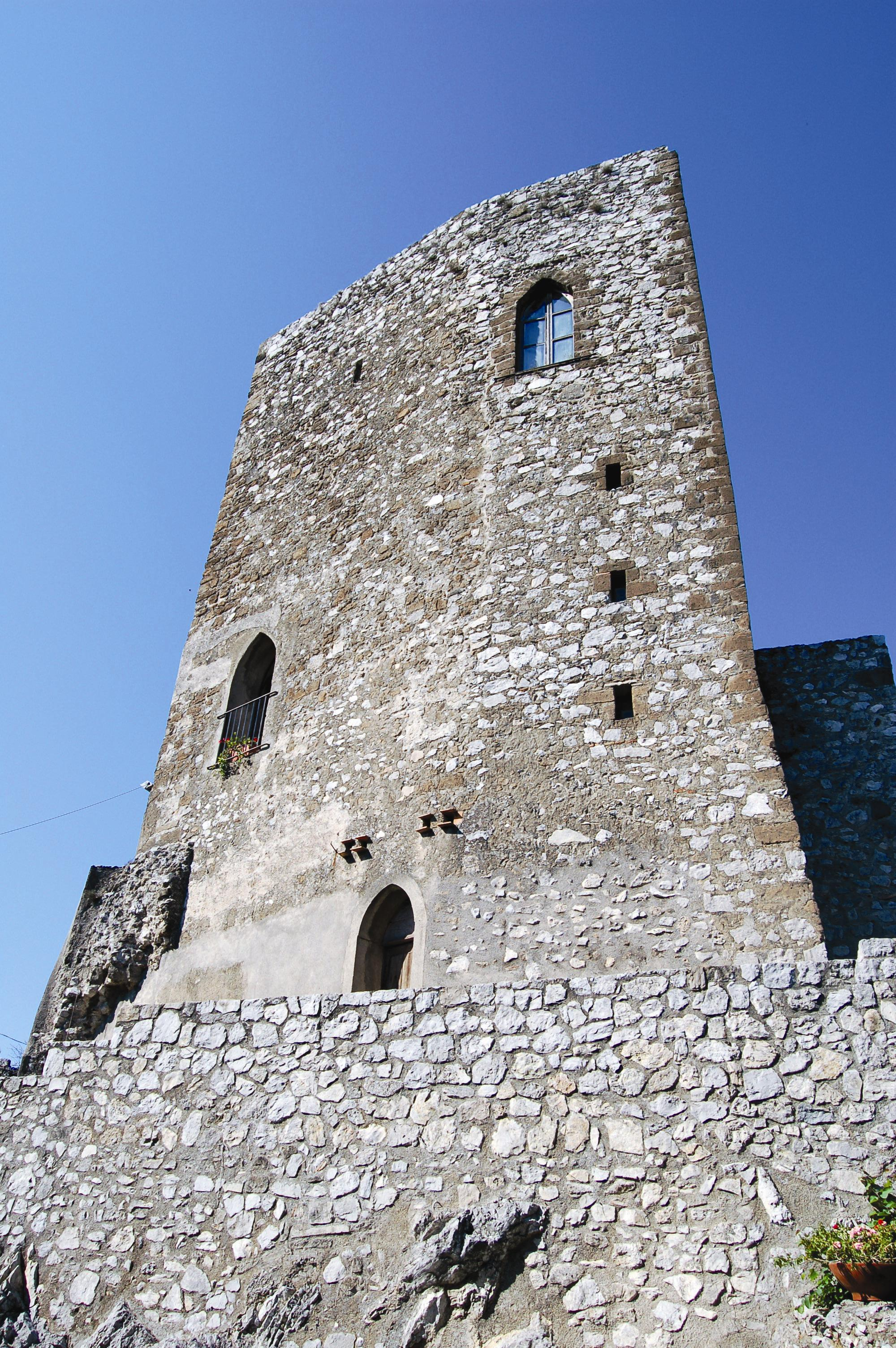
The Torre Normanno-Sveva, Castello del Parco, Nocera Inferiore

During this time, the Western Schism developed, one of the largest fractures of Christianity in the Middle Ages. Two Popes were elected: Bartolomeo Prignano, Archbishop of Bari (who took the name of Urban VI) and Robert, Cardinal of Geneva (who became Clement VII). The first lived in Rome, the second in Avignon. After some hesitation, Joanna decided for Clement VII and supported him with 50,000 florins. Urban VI for his part encouraged the enemies of Joanna: the King of Hungary, the Duke of Andria and Charles of Durazzo. Being in a critical situation, Joanna appealed to Clement VII, who advised her to use Louis I of Anjou in her favor. France and Avignon counted on Naples to give them a foothold in Italy, if it came to resolving the schism by force. However, for Joanna, the main factor of her support to Clement VII was Urban VI's attempts to take Naples away from her and to cede part of her Kingdom to his nephew, Francesco Prignano. On 11 May 1380 Urban VI declared her a heretic and her Kingdom, a papal fief, to be forfeit and bestowed it upon Charles of Durazzo.

In exchange for his help, Joanna adopted Louis I of Anjou as her heir on 29 June 1380, replacing Charles of Durazzo. This agreement realized the ambitions that the Duke of Anjou harboured for a long time. Charles of Durazzo then invaded Naples in November 1380 at the head of an army mainly composed by Hungarians.

Louis I of Anjou may not have understood the gravity of the situation in Naples and didn't intervene immediately because he was forced to remain in France after his brother's death as a regent of his nephew and new King Charles VI.

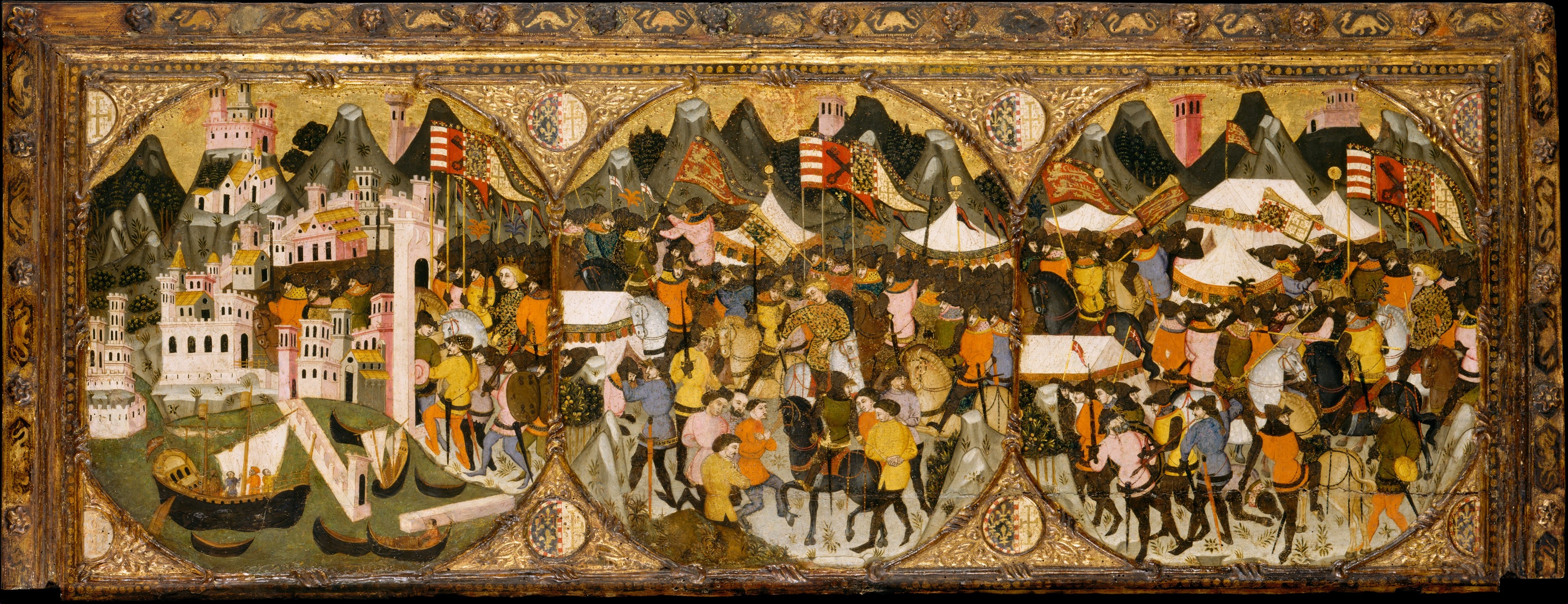
The conquest of Naples by Charles of Durazzo, who defeated the forces of Otto of Brunswick in 1381.

Joanna entrusted her husband Otto of Brunswick with the few troops she could muster, but he was unable to stop the forces of Charles of Durazzo, who on 28 June 1381 crossed the borders of the Kingdom of Naples. After Otto's defeat at Anagni, and bypassing the Neapolitan defences at Aversa, Charles entered Naples on 16 July at 7 p.m. and besieged Joanna in Castel Nuovo. Without any help, Joanna was forced to surrender on 25 August and was imprisoned, firstly in Castel dell'Ovo and later, in December, she was transferred to the Castello del Parco at Nocera Inferiore.

Catherine of Siena viewed Joanna as a demonically misguided ruler due to her support for Clement VII over Urban VI. In her letter to Joanna, Catherine told Joanna to consider her temporal position invalid by supporting the Pope in Avignon: “And if I consider your condition akin to those temporal and transitory goods that pass like the wind, you yourself have deprived yourself of them by your actions.” What Catherine was referring to was the legal position of Naples in relation to the Papacy. While Joanna had been established as the legitimate ruler of the Neapolitan Kingdom, she was also under the rule of the Pope in Rome. The Neapolitan throne had been under legal oversight of the Papacy "since the mid-thirteenth century, and the kingdom was a valuable source of revenue, prestige, and soldiers for the Church."

== Assassination ==
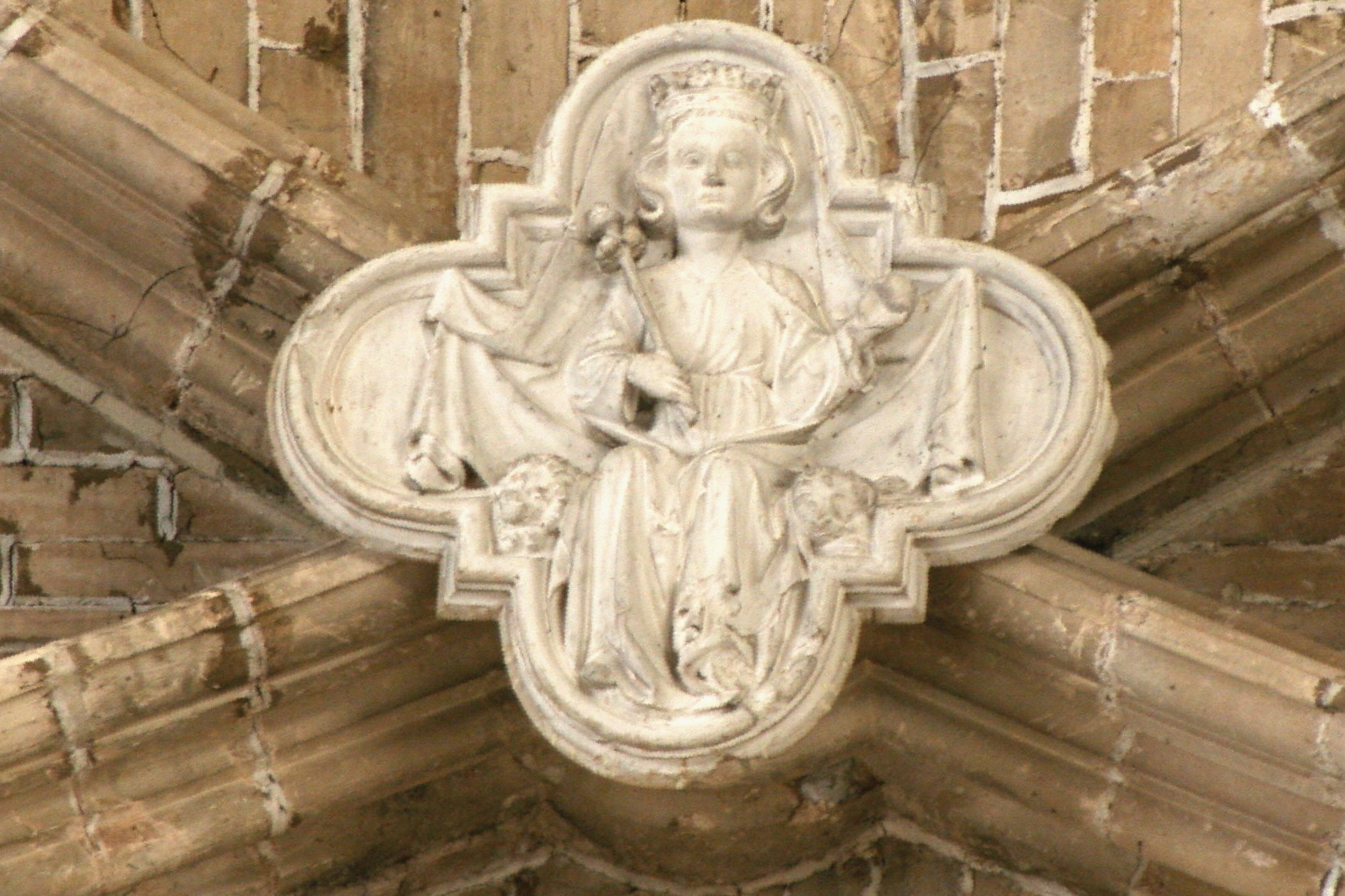
Bas-relief of Queen Joanna at Saint-Maximin-la-Sainte-Baume

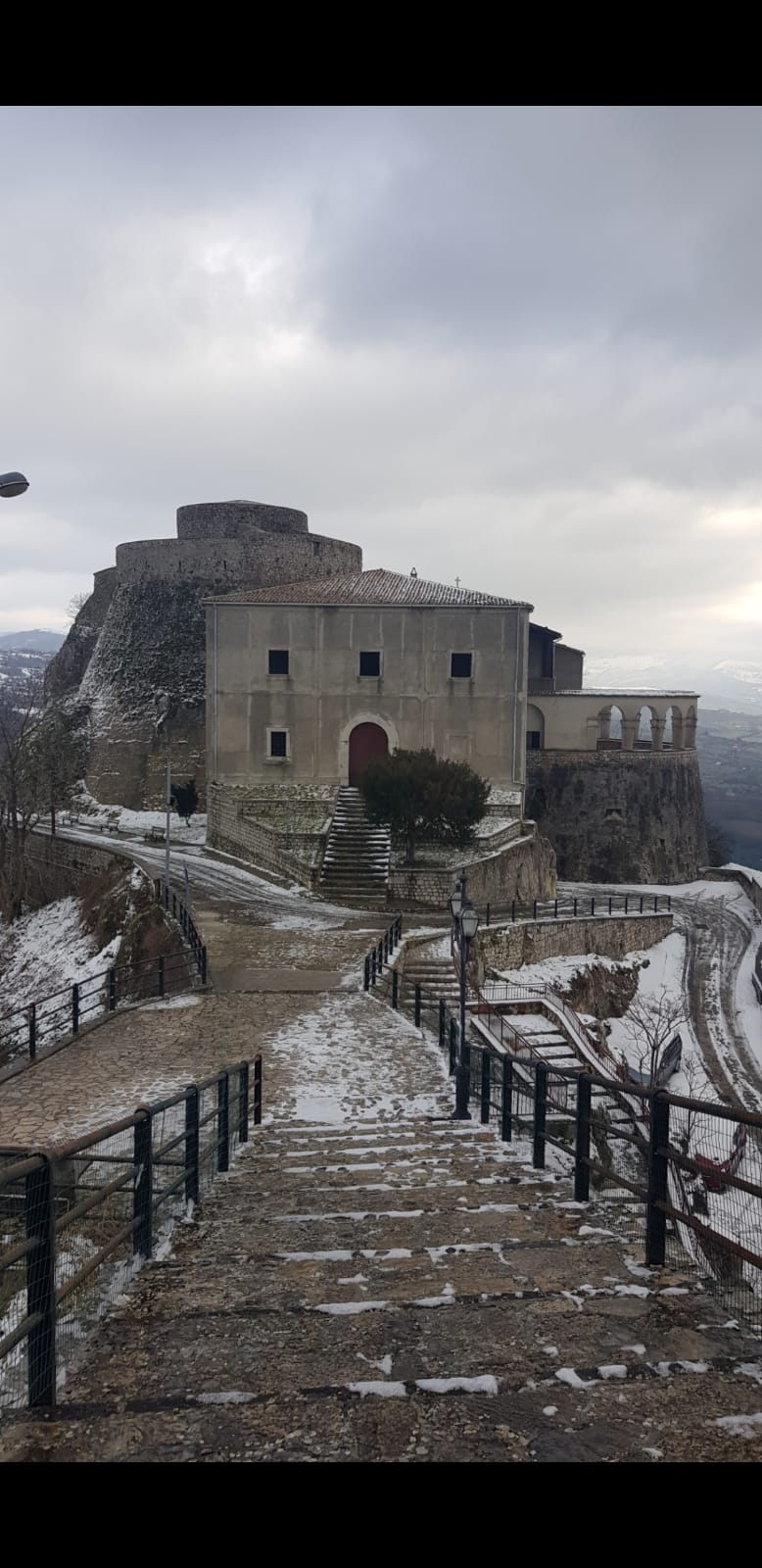
Modern view of the entrance of the Castle of Muro Lucano

Louis I of Anjou finally decided to act and went to Avignon at the head of a powerful army on 31 May 1382 in order to rescue Joanna. He passed through Turin and Milan. Towards the beginning of September, he was in Amatrice, near Rome. But by that time the Queen was already dead. Charles of Durazzo, thinking that he couldn't resist Louis I of Anjou, decided on 28 May 1382 that Joanna should be transferred from the Castello del Parco to the Castle of Muro Lucano held by Palamede Bozzuto, where she was killed on 27 July 1382, aged 56.

In his official statement, Charles claimed Joanna died of natural causes. However, other documentary sources unanimously claim she was murdered. Because of the nature of the remote and clandestine act, the accounts of the manner in which Joanna was slain vary. The two most authentic sources:

- Thomas of Niem, secretary to Urban VI, states Joanna was strangled with a silken chord whilst kneeling in prayer in the private chapel at Muro castle by Hungarian soldiers.
- Marie of Blois, wife of Louis I of Anjou, states Joanna was killed by four men, presumably Hungarian, with her hands and feet tied and then smothered between two feather mattresses.

Since there is no testimony from witnesses present at the time of her murder, it is impossible to say definitively which (or indeed any) of the reports is accurate. Another account states she was smothered with pillows.

Her body was brought to Naples where for several days it was put on display to the public as proof of her death. As Urban VI had excommunicated Joanna, the Queen could not be buried in consecrated ground and was therefore tossed into a deep well within the grounds of the church of Santa Chiara. The Neapolitan Kingdom was left to decades of recurring wars of succession. Louis I of Anjou was able to retain the mainland counties of Provence and Forcalquier. James of Baux, the nephew of Philip II of Taranto, claimed the Principality of Achaea after her deposition in 1381.

== In literature ==
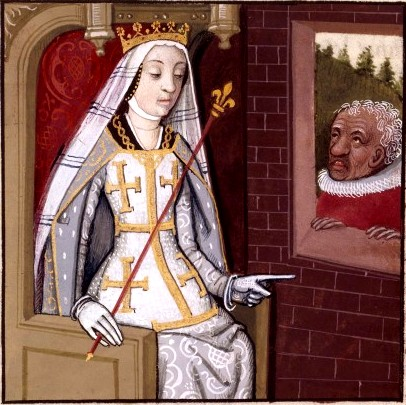
Miniature of Queen Joanna from a manuscript of Giovanni Boccaccio's De mulieribus claris. Currently in the Bibliothèque Nationale de France.

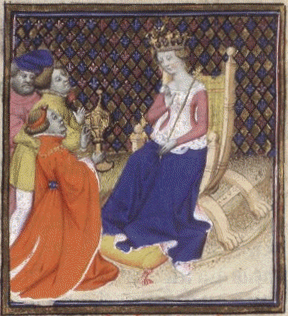
Another miniature of Queen Joanna in De mulieribus claris. Currently in the Bibliothèque Nationale de France.

- Giovanni Boccaccio wrote a biography of Joanna in his series of biographies known as De mulieribus claris (en: On Famous Women). Boccaccio devoted part of his biography of Joanna to dispelling any idea that Joanna was not the rightful ruler of Naples, which Boccaccio did by proclaiming that Joanna was a descendant of a noble bloodline. Boccaccio claimed that Joanna I's bloodline could be traced all the way back to “Dardanus, the founder of Troy, whose father the ancients said was Jupiter." Boccaccio also definitively and unequivocally proclaimed Joanna to be the lawful ruler of Naples by discussing the manner in which she ascended the Neapolitan throne. Boccaccio mentioned in his biography of Joanna that she rightfully inherited the kingdom from her grandfather because Joanna's father had died in his youth. In addition to demonstrating for his readers that Joanna was the rightful Queen of Naples, Boccaccio revealed his personal support for Joanna during the chaos of her reign and the controversy surrounding it. In Boccaccio's view, the question of whether a woman could reign or if there were other nobles who were more fit to rule was irrelevant because of Joanna. Boccaccio also discussed her capabilities and the aspects of her reign that made her a great ruler in his eyes. When Boccaccio summarized all of the areas and provinces that Joanna ruled over, he described Naples as having remarkable towns, fruitful fields, great nobles, and great wealth, but he also emphasized that “Joanna's spirit [was] equal to ruling it”. Additionally, Boccaccio claimed that the reason why Naples was a prosperous Kingdom was because it was no longer inhabited by the Hungarian Royal Family and their supporters whom he disliked. Boccaccio claimed that Joanna “bravely attacked and cleaned out the bands of wicked men” who had occupied Naples.
- Alexandre Dumas, père wrote a romance, Joan of Naples, part of his eight-volume series Celebrated Crimes (1839–40).
- A fictionalised account of her life can also be found in the novel Queen of Night by Alan Savage.
- László Passuth wrote a novel Napolyi Johanna (Joanna of Naples, 1968) about her life.
- Marcel Brion, La reine Jeanne (Queen Joanna), Société des Bibliophiles de Provence, 1936 (Artist's book illustrated with etchings by Hungarian born French artist Làszlò Barta); 1944 (published by Robert Laffont).
- The Nobel Prize in Literature Frédéric Mistral wrote in 1890 the drama La Rèino Jano, narrating the passage of the Queen on her Provençal domains during her flying by Naples.
- Walter Savage Landor wrote dramas in verse, titled Andrea of Hungary, and Giovanna of Naples.

== Titles and styles ==
Joanna's full style as queen was: Joanna, by the Grace of God, Queen of Jerusalem and of Sicily, Duchess of Apulia, Princess of Capua, and Countess of Provence, Forqualquier, and Piedmont.

== Bibliography ==
- Abulafia, David (2000). "The Italian south". In Jones, Michael (ed.). The New Cambridge Medieval History, Volume 6, c.1300–c.1415. Cambridge: Cambridge University Press. pp. 488–514. ISBN 978-1-13905574-1.
- Busquet, Raoul (1978). Laffont, Robert (ed.). Histoire de Marseille.
- Busquet, Raoul (30 November 1954). Histoire de Provence (1997 ed.). Imprimerie nationale de Monaco.
- Casteen, Elizabeth (2015). From She-Wolf to Martyr: The Reign and Disputed Reputation of Johanna I of Naples. Cornell University Press. ISBN 978-0-8014-5386-1.
- Casteen, Elizabeth (3 June 2011). "Sex and Politics in Naples: The Regnant Queenship of Johanna I". Journal of the Historical Society. 11 (2). Malden, MA, USA: Blackwell Publishing: 183–210. doi:10.1111/j.1540-5923.2011.00329.x. ISSN 1529-921X. OCLC 729296907. (subscription required)
- Cox, Eugene L. (1967). The Green Count of Savoy. Princeton, New Jersey: Princeton University Press. LCCN 67-11030.
- da Gravina, Domenico [in Italian] (1890). Ludovico Antonio Muratore (ed.). Chronicon de Rebus in Apulia Gestis (AA. 1333-1350) (PDF). Naples: Ernesto Anfossi Editore.
- Duran, Michelle M. (2010). "The Politics of Art: Imaging Sovereignty in the Anjou Bible at Leuven". In Watteeuw, Lieve; Van der Stock, Jan (eds.). The Anjou Bible. a Royal Manuscript Revealed: Naples 1340. Peeter. pp. 73–94. ISBN 978-9-0429-2445-1.
- Engel, Pál (2001). The Realm of St Stephen: A History of Medieval Hungary, 895–1526. I.B. Tauris Publishers. ISBN 978-1-86064-061-2.
- Gaglione, Mario (2009). Converà ti que aptengas la flor: profili di sovrani angioini, da Carlo I a Renato (1266-1442) (in Italian). Milan: Academia.edu.
- Goldstone, Nancy (2009). The Lady Queen: The Notorious Reign of Joanna I, Queen of Naples, Jerusalem, and Sicily. Walker&Company. ISBN 978-0-8027-7770-6.
- Grierson, Philip; Travaini, Lucia (1998). Medieval European Coinage, Volume 14: Italy (III) (South Italy, Sicily, Sardinia). Cambridge: Cambridge University Press.
- Léonard, Émile-G. (1932). "Histoire de Jeanne Ire, reine de Naples, comtesse de Provence (1343-1382) : La jeunesse de la reine Jeanne". In Picard, Auguste (ed.). Mémoires et documents historiques.
- Léonard, Émile-G. (1954). Les Angevins de Naples. Paris: Presses universitaires de France.
- Lucherini, Vinni (2013). "The Journey of Charles I, King of Hungary, from Visegrád to Naples (1333): Its Political Implications and Artistic Consequences". Hungarian Historical Review. 2 (2): 341–362.
- Monter, William (2012). The Rise of Female Kings in Europe, 1300-1800. Yale University Press. ISBN 978-0-300-17327-7.
- Paladilhe, Dominique (1997). La reine Jeanne : comtesse de Provence. Librairie Académique Perrin. ISBN 978-2-262-00699-0.

Joanna I of Naples Capetian House of Anjou Cadet branch of the Capetian dynasty Born: December 1325 Died: 27 July 1382
Regnal titles
Preceded by Robert	Queen of Naples; 1343–1382 with Louis I (1348–1362)	Succeeded by Charles III
Preceded by Robert	Countess of Provence and Forcalquier; 1343–1382 with Louis I (1348–1362)	Succeeded by Louis II
Preceded by Philip III	Princess of Achaea; 1373–1381	Succeeded by James
