= Charles, Duke of Calabria =

Charles
- Duke of Calabria
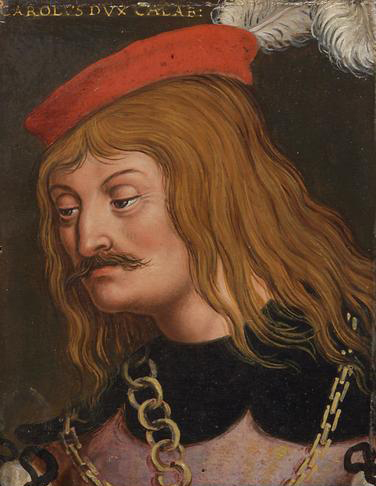
- Portrait by Anton Boys
- Born: 1298; Naples
- Died: 9 November 1328 (aged 29–30); Naples
- Burial: Santa Chiara Basilica
- Spouses: Catherine of Austria (m. 1316; died 1323) Marie of Valois (m. 1323)
- Issue among others...: Joanna I of Naples; Charles Martel; Maria of Calabria
- House: Anjou-Naples
- Father: Robert of Naples
- Mother: Yolanda of Aragon

Coat of arms of the Duke of Calabria.

Charles, Duke of Calabria (1298 – 9 November 1328), was the Duke of Calabria from 1309 until his death. Upon his father's elevation as King of Naples, he was made vicar-general of Naples and duke of Calabria He was elected as signore by the city of Florence in 1326. Charles died on 9 November 1328 in Naples.

== Life ==
Charles was born in Naples, the son of King Robert of Naples and Yolanda of Aragon, in 1298. Little is known of his early life, so one can assume that he spent his early years at the court of his grandfather. In 1309, Charles' grandfather died and his father became King Robert the Wise. It was then that he became Duke of Calabria and was created Vicar-General of the Kingdom of Sicily (Naples). (Note: Samantha Kelly indicates a document dated October 1322, refers to Charles as vicar general of the Regno.) His father intended him to lead the force sent to aid Florence in 1315, but was constrained by time to send his uncle, Philip I of Taranto, instead. The Florentine-Neapolitan coalition was badly beaten at the ensuing Battle of Montecatini.

The victory of Castruccio Castracani at Altopascio in 1325 led the Florentines to elect Charles signore (lord) of the city for ten years in 1326. At the time, he was unsuccessfully attempting to seize Sicily from his first cousin Frederick III, and sent Walter VI of Brienne as his deputy until he could arrive, where Walter made a favorable impression. While Charles' arrival checked Castruccio, he exacted onerous taxes from the Florentines, until he was recalled to Naples in December 1327 due to the advance of Emperor Louis IV into Italy. There he died on 9 November 1328. He left as heir his eldest surviving daughter, Joanna Ι; a posthumous daughter, Marie, was born in 1329.

Charles was buried in the church of Santa Chiara in Naples.

== Marriages and issue ==
In 1316, Charles married Catherine of Austria (1295–1323), daughter of Albert I of Germany. Catherine died in 1323, and Charles married Marie of Valois (1309–1332), daughter of Charles of Valois, later that same year. They had:

- Eloisa (b. January or February 1325 – d. 27 December 1325).
- Joanna Ι (b. Naples, March 1326 – d. castello di San Fele, 22 May 1382), Queen of Naples, succeeded her grandfather, Robert the Wise
- Charles Martel (b. Florence, 13 April 1327 – d. Florence, 21 April 1327)
- Maria (b. posthumously, Naples, May 1329 – d. Naples, 20 May 1366), Countess of Alba, married firstly Charles, Duke of Durazzo; married secondly Robert of Baux, and finally Philip II of Taranto

== Sources ==
- Brucker, Gene A. (1998). Florence, the Golden Age, 1138-1737. University of California Press.
- Dean, Trevor, ed. (2000). The towns of Italy in the later Middle Ages. Manchester University Press.
- Diakité, Rala I.; Sneider, Matthew T., eds. (2022). The Eleventh and Twelfth Books of Giovanni Villani's "New Chronicle". Walter de Gruyter Gmbh.
- Hourihane, Colum, ed. (2012). "Naples I". The Grove Encyclopedia of Medieval Art and Architecture. Vol. 4. Oxford University Press.
- Kelly, Samantha (2003). The New Solomon: Robert of Naples (1309-1343) and Fourteenth-Century Kingship. Brill.
- Kelly, Samantha (2004). "Religious patronage and royal propaganda in Angevin Naples: Santa Maria Donna Regina in context". In Elliott, Janis; Warr, Cordelia (eds.). The Church of Santa Maria Donna Regina: "Art, Iconography and Patronage in Fourteenth-Century Naples. Ashgate Publishing. pp. 27–44.
- Fasolt, Constantin (1991). Council and Hierarchy: The Political Thought of William Durant the Younger. Cambridge University Press.
- Musto, Ronald G. (2003). Apocalypse in Rome: Cola di Rienzo and the Politics of the New Age. University of California Press.
- Partner, Peter (1972). The Lands of St Peter: The Papal State in the Middle Ages and the Early Renaissance. University of California Press.
- Pryds, Darleen N. (2000). The King Embodies the Word: Robert d'Anjou and the Politics of Preaching. Brill.
