= Family tree of Aragonese monarchs =

This is a family tree of the monarchs of the Kingdom of Aragon.

The colors denote the monarchs from the: - House of Jiménez; - House of Barcelona; - House of Trastámara

—— The solid lines denote the legitimate descents

– – – - The dashed lines denote a marriage

· · · · The dotted lines denote the liaisons and illegitimate descents

Sancho III the Great; King of Pamplona; 990–1035 r.1004–1035 | Sancha of Aibar ≈995-1070
Ermesinda of Bigorre; 1015–1049 | Ramiro I King of Aragon bef.1007–1063 r.1035–1063 | Agnes of Aquitaine
Urraca | Isabella of Urgell ?-1071 | Sancho I Ramírez; King of Aragon ≈1042–1094 r.1063–1094 | Ermengol III; Count of Urgell; 1032–1066 r.1038–1066 | Sancha of Aragón bef.1045–1097 | García; Bishop of Aragon ≈1046-1086
Bertha of Aragon ≈1075– bef.1111 | Peter I King of Aragon; 1068/9–1104 r.1094–1104 | Agnes of Aquitaine; 1072–1097 | Felicia of Roucy ≈1060–1123 | Alfonso VI; King of León and Castile; 1040–1109 r.1072–1109
Pedro of Aragón ≈1086-1104 | Inés of Aragón ?-1103 | Ramiro II the Monk; King of Aragon; 1086–1157 r.1134–1157 | Agnes of Aquitaine; 1105–1159 | Fernando of Aragón; 1071–1094 | Alfonso I the Battler; King of Aragon; 1074–1134 r.1104–1134 | Urraca; Queen of León and Castile; 1079–1126 r.1109–1126
Ramon; Berenguer IV; Ct. of Barcelona; 1113–1162 r.1131–1162 | Petronilla; Queen of Aragon; 1136-1173 r.1137–1164 | Alfonso VII the Emperor; King of Castile; 1105-1157 r.1127–1157
Pedro of Aragón; 1152-bef.1158 | Ramon; Berenguer III; Ct. of Provence ≈1158–1181 r.1173–1181 | Dulce of Barcelona; 1160–1198 | Sancho I King of Portugal; 1154–1212 r.1185–1212 | Sancho; Ct. of Provence; 1161–1223 r.1181–1185 | Alfonso II the Chaste; King of Aragon; 1157–1196 r.1164–1196 | Sancha of Castile; 1154/5–1208 | Sancho III; King of Castile ≈1134–1158 r.1157–1158
Raymond VI; Ct. of Toulouse; 1156–1222 r.1194–1222 | Leonor of Aragón; 1182–1226 | Sancha of Aragón; 1186–1241 | Dulce of Aragon; 1192–? | Béla III; King of Hungary; 1148–1196 r.1172–1196 | Alfonso II; Ct. of Provence; 1174–1209 | Garsenda of Forcalquier ≈1180–1242 | Fernando of Aragon; 1190–1249 | Alfonso VIII the Noble; King of Castile; 1155-1214 r.1158–1214
Raymond VII; Ct. of Toulouse; 1197–1249 r.1222–1249 | Frederick II; Holy Roman Emp. 1194–1250 r.1220–1250 | Constance of Aragon; 1179–1222 | Emeric; King of Hungary; 1174–1204 r.1196–1204 | Andrew II; King of Hungary; 1177–1235 r.1205–1235 | Maria of Montpellier; 1182–1213 | Peter II the Catholic; King of Aragon; 1178–1213 r.1196–1213 | Ramon; Berenguer ?-1190s | Berengaria of Castile; 1179–1246
Violant of Hungary; 1215–1251 | James I the Conqueror; King of Aragon; 1208-1276 r.1213–1276 | Teresa Gil de Vidaure ?-1285 | Eleanor of Castile; 1200–1244
Ferdinand of Aragon; 1245–1250 | Sancha of Aragon; 1246–bef.1275 | Maria of Aragon; 1248–1267 | Sancho; Archb. of Toledo; 1250–1279 | James; Lord of Xèrica ≈1255–1285 | Peter; Lord of Ayerbe; 1259–1318 | Constance of Béarn ?-1310 | Alfonso of Aragon; 1229–1260 | Ferdinand III; King of Castile; 1201–1252 r.1217–1252
Philip III; King of France; 1245–1285 r.1270–1285 | Isabella of Aragon; 1248–1271 | Charles II; King of Naples; 1254–1309 r.1285–1309 | Esclaramunda of Foix; 1255–1315 | James II; King of Majorca; 1243-1311 r.1276–1286 /1295-1311 | Peter III the Great; King of Aragon; 1239-1285 r.1276–1285 | Constance of Sicily; 1249–1302 | Constance of Aragon; 1239–1269 | Manuel of Castile; 1234–1283 | Violant of Aragon; 1236–1301 | Alfonso X the Wise; King of Castile; 1221-1284 r.1252–1284
Denis; King of Portugal; 1261–1325 r.1279–1325 | Isabel of Aragon; 1271–1336 | Eleanor of Anjou; 1289–1341 | Frederick III; King of Sicily; 1272-1337 r.1296–1337 | Robert; King of Naples; 1277–1343 r.1309–1343 | Violante of Aragon; 1273–1302 | Alfonso III the Liberal; King of Aragon; 1265-1291 r.1285–1291 | Pedro of Aragón; 1275–1296 | Guillerma II of Montcada | Sancho IV; King of Castile; 1258-1295 r.1284–1295
Philip I Prince of Taranto; 1278–1332 | Afonso IV; King of Portugal; 1291–1357 r.1325–1357 | Blanche of Anjou; 1280–1310 | Marie of Lusignan; 1273–1319 | James II the Just; King of Aragon; 1267–1327 r.1291–1327 | Elisenda of Montcada; 1292–1364 | Isabella of Castile; 1283–1328
Blanca of Tarento; 1309?-1338? | Ramon; Berenguer; Ct. of Ampurias ≈1308–1366 | María; Álvarez of Jérica; 1310–1364 | John; Patriarch of Alexandria; 1304–1334 r.1327–1334 | Blanche; Prioress of Sixena; 1307–1348 | Isabella of Aragon; 1305–1330 | Frederick III the Fair; King of Germany; 1289–1330 r.1314–1330 | Maria of Aragon; Lady of Cameros; 1299–1347 | Peter of Castile; Lord of Cameros; 1290–1319 | Ferdinand IV; King of Castile; 1285–1312 r.1295–1312
Philip; Despot of Romania ?-1331 | Violante; 1310–1353 | Lope de Luna; Lord of Segorbe ?-1360 | Juan; Manuel; Prince of Villena; 1282–1348 | Constance; 1300–1327 | James of Aragon; 1296–1334 | Eleanor of Castile; 1307–1359 | Alfonso IV the Kind; King of Aragon; 1299-1336 r.1327–1336 | Teresa d'Entença; 1300–1327 | Peter; Ct. of Ribagorza; 1305–1381 r.1322–1381 | Joan of Foix
Peter I King of Portugal; 1320–1367 r.1357–1367 | Fernando; Marquis of Tortosa; 1329–1363 | John of Aragon; 1331–1358 | Isabel Núñez de Lara | James III; King of Majorca ≈1315 –1349 r.1324–1344 | Constance of Aragon; 1318–1346 | James I Ct. of Urgell; 1320-1347 r.1336–1347 | Cecilia I of Urgel ?-1384 | Philip III; King of Navarre; 1306-1343 r.1328–1343 | Joan II; Queen of Navarre; 1312–1349 r.1328–1349 | Alfonso XI; King of Castile; 1311–1350 r.1312–1350
Maria; Marchioness of Tortosa; 1342–_{after}1363 | Eleanor of Portugal; 1328–1348 | Sibila of Fortia ?-1406 | Peter IV el Cerimonióso; King of Aragon; 1319-1387 r.1336–1387 | Eleanor of Sicily; 1325–1375 | Maria of Navarre; 1329–1347 | Charles II the Bad; King of Navarre; 1332–1387 r.1349–1387 | Henry II; King of Castile; 1334–1379 r.1366–1379
Alfonso; 1376–1377 | Peter; 1379 | Isabella of Aragon; 1376–1424 | James II; Count of Urgell; 1380–1433 r.1408–1413 | Frederick III the Simple; King of Sicily; 1341–1377 r.1355–1377 | Constance of Aragon; 1343–1363 | Joanna of Aragon; 1344–1385 | John I Count of Ampurias; 1338–1398
Maria de Luna; 1358–1406 | Martin the Elder; King of Aragon; 1356–1410 r.1396–1410 | Margaret of Prades; 1388/95–1429 | Martha of Armagnac; 1347–1378 | John I the Hunter; King of Aragon; 1350–1396 r.1387–1396 | Violant of Bar; 1365–1431 | Eleanor of Aragon; 1358–1382 | John I King of Castile; 1358–1390 r.1379–1390 | Charles III the Noble; King of Navarre; 1361–1425 r.1387–1425 | Eleanor of Castile aft.1363–1416
John; 1380–? | James; 1378–? | Matthew; Count of Foix; 1363–1398 | Joanna of Aragon; 1375–1407 | Yolande of Aragon ≈1380 –1442 | Louis II; King of Naples; 1389–1399 | James; 1382–1388
John I King of Portugal; 1358–1433 r.1385–1433 | Margaret; 1384/88-? | Martin I King of Sicily; 1390–1409 r.1356–1409 | Catherine of Lancaster; 1373–1418 | Henry III; King of Castile; 1379–1406 r.1390–1406 | Ferdinand I King of Aragon; 1380-1416 r.1412–1416 | Eleanor of Alburquerque; 1374–1435
Edward; King of Portugal; 1391–1438 r.1433–1438 | Eleanor of Aragon; 1402–1445 | Maria of Aragon; 1396–1445 | John II; King of Castile; 1405–1454 r.1406–1454 | Isabella of Portugal; 1428–1496 | Maria of Castile; 1401–1458 | Alfonso V King of Aragon; 1396–1458 r.1416–1458 | Catherine of Castile; 1403–1439 | Henry; Duke of Villena; 1400–1445
Joan of Portugal; 1439–1475 | Henry IV the Impotent; King of Castile; 1425–1474 r.1454–1474 | Blanche II; Queen of Navarre; 1424–1464 r.1461–1464 de jure | Juana; Enríquez of Córdoba; 1425–1468 | John II the Great; King of Aragon; 1398–1479 r.1458–1479 | Blanche I Queen of Navarre; 1387–1441 r.1425–1441 | Peter; Count of Alburquerque; 1405–1438
Afonso V King of Portugal; 1432–1481 r.1438–1481 | Joanna la Beltraneja; 1462–1530 | Isabella I the Catholic; Queen of Castile; 1451-1504 r.1474–1504 | Ferdinand II the Catholic; King of Aragon; 1452-1516 r.1479–1516 | Joanna of Aragon; 1454–1517 | Ferdinand I Ferrante; King of Naples; 1423–1494 r.1458–1494 | Agnes of Cleves; 1422–1448 | Charles (IV); King of Navarre; 1421–1461 r.1441–1461 de jure | Eleanor; Queen of Navarre; 1426–1479 r.1479 | Gaston IV; Count of Foix; 1422–1472 r.1436–1472
Family tree of Spanish monarchs also Kings of Aragon
