= Constanza Manuel =

Queen of Castile and León from 1325 to 1327

Constance Manuel of Villena
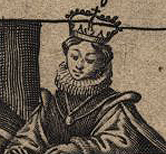
- Effigy of Constance Manuel in a 1645 Genealogy of the Kings of Portugal (National Library of Portugal)

Queen consort of Castile and León
- Tenure: 1325–1327
- Born: c. 1318; Castillo de Garcimuñoz
- Died: 27 January 1349 (aged 30–31); Santarém, Portugal
- Burial: Santarém, Portugal
- Spouses: Alfonso XI of Castile (m. 1325–1327); Peter I of Portugal (m. 1340)
- Issue among others: Maria, Marchioness of Tortosa; Ferdinand I, King of Portugal
- House: Castilian House of Ivrea
- Father: Juan Manuel, Prince of Villena
- Mother: Constance of Aragon, Princess of Villena

Constanza Manuel of Villena (c. 1318 – 27 January 1349), was a Castilian noblewoman who by her two marriages was Queen consort of Castile and León and Infanta of Portugal.

== Early years and first marriage: Queen of Castile ==
Born in Castillo de Garcimuñoz in 1318, Constanza was the daughter of Castilian nobleman and writer Don Juan Manuel (1282–1348), Duke of Peñafiel, "powerful and hardworking magnate of Castile" and his second wife, Infanta Constance of Aragon, Princess of Villena, daughter of King James II of Aragon. She was the only surviving child of her parents' marriage: her two full siblings, Beatriz and Manuel, both died young; in addition, Constanza had several half-siblings from her father's third marriage and several extramarital affairs, including Juana Manuel (later wife of King Henry II of Castile).

After the death of King Ferdinand IV of Castile in 1312, Don Juan Manuel was one of the tutors of his son and successor, King Alfonso XI when he was still a minor. Upon reaching the legal age of majority in 1325, the King prescinded from his tutors and began his personal rule. It was then that Don Juan Manuel, not wanting to lose his power, formed an alliance with the recently widowed Lord of Biscay, Juan de Haro, nicknamed "el Tuerto" (the One-eyed), and tried to marry his daughter Constanza -who was then about nine years old-, with him. This union never took place, because King Alfonso XI (fearful of the union of two of the most powerful vassals of his Kingdom) asked for himself the hand of Constanza in marriage, and ordered the assassination of Juan de Haro.

The betrothal of Constanza and King Alfonso XI was ratified by the Courts of Valladolid on 28 November 1325, but given the bride's minority, the marriage was never consummated, although Constanza became to use the title of Queen consort of Castile and as such she wrote her letters to her grandfather King James II of Aragon. Two years later, in 1327, Constanza was repudiated, as the Castilian monarch was more interested in marrying with his double first-cousin Infanta Maria of Portugal, daughter of King Afonso IV, in order to strengthen ties with the Lusitan kingdom.

== Second marriage: Infanta of Portugal ==
King Afonso IV quickly learned that his daughter Maria was being mistreated by her husband King Alfonso XI of Castile. Don Juan Manuel had "an opportunity to being compensate for the procedure of his sovereign", and made an alliance with the Portuguese monarch (who felt as though his daughter was being dishonored), sealed with the marriage of Constanza to the heir of the Portuguese throne, Infante Pedro.

The contract for the wedding, signed in 1335 stipulated, among other things, that: Constanza would maintain the manors and the free disposition of the lands delivered for the sustenance of her house; her father could visit her as many times as he wanted; the first son of the marriage would inherit the crown of Portugal while the second son would succeed to the House of Manuel but, if this second-born son was not born, the House of Manuel would be inherited by the Infante Pedro or his heir; and, that under no circumstances would the lands of Don Juan Manuel join those of the Crown of Castile.

This agreement was not to the liking of the Castilian monarch who did everything possible to prevent Constanza from traveling to Portugal and imprisoned her at the Alcázar of Toro to pressure Don Juan Manuel to desist from this marriage. Don Juan Manuel claimed his daughter but King Alfonso XI refused to give her up. However, the marriage by proxy was celebrated, first in Portugal, on 28 February 1336 at the Convent of São Francisco in Évora with the presence of Infante Pedro, his parents and several bishops, and, as proxies of Constanza, Fernão and Lopo Garcia. Although the bride and groom were 2nd cousins (being both great-grandchildren of King Pedro III of Aragon), it did not take long to obtain the papal dispensation.

The Portuguese King felt offended by the fact that King Alfonso XI still held Constanza in Toro, as well as by the humiliating treatment of the Castilian monarch towards his wife, María of Portugal, while King Alfonso XI reproached his father-in-law for not lending him the promised help in the fight against the Moors. This led to a war between the two kingdoms that lasted three years and raised the concern of other Christian kingdoms and Pope Benedict XII, who played a crucial role in ending this conflict. Peace between the Kingdoms of Castile and Portugal was agreed in Seville in the summer of 1339. Don Juan Manuel gave 800,000 doblas as a dowry for the marriage. A year later, in October 1340, King Afonso IV helped the Castilian sovereign and had an outstanding participation in the Battle of Salado.

Finally, Constance was able to travel to Portugal, in whose entourage was her relative, the Galician noblewoman Inês de Castro, with whom Infante Pedro of Portugal ("an impassioned man, brutal and with a hint of vesanic") quickly fell deeply in love. King Afonso IV complied with the agreement he had with Don Juan Manuel and he gave his daughter-in-law the arras that included the towns of Montemor-o-Novo and Alenquer as well as the city of Viseu as other Queens of Portugal previously received. This letter of arras was issued in Lisbon on 7 July 1340, and the following month, on 24 August, the official wedding was celebrated at Lisbon Cathedral.

The love relationship between Infante Pedro and Inês de Castro caused some discomfort among the members of the Royal Council. They were faced with the circumstance that Inês was the sister of two powerful Galician noblemen, Álvaro Pérez de Castro and Fernando de Castro, whose influence in Portugal was felt through their sister. As a way to end the affair of her husband and her relative, when Constanza gave birth her first son, Infante Luiz, she invited Inês to be his godmother. According to the precepts of the Catholic Church at the time, the relationship between the godparent and a parent of the person being baptized was one of moral kinship, and their love would be almost incestuous; however, the child would die within a week, which increased suspicions about Inês de Castro. The adulterous romance would continue and intensified with time, until King Afonso IV exiled the Galician noblewoman to Alburquerque, on the Castilian border, in 1344. This second attempt to separate the lovers did not end the relationship, and Infante Pedro and Inês began living together in secret.

== Death and burial ==
The traditional date for Constanza's death is 13 November 1345, about two weeks after the birth of the infante Fernando, born on 31 October. However, according to the chronicler Rui de Pina and the Crónica dos Sete Primeiros Reis de Portugal, she died after giving birth to the infanta Maria. The Portuguese writer, bibliographer and genealogist, Antonio Caetano de Sousa, in his work Historia Genealógica de la Real Casa Portuguesa, cites a document from the archive of the Royal Monastery of Lorvão where it is stated that Constanza was still alive in 1347 and that in that year she was Lady of Alenquer, as well as what he had found of what ancient chroniclers had written about the time of her dealings with Inês de Castro. The historian Frederico Francisco Stuart de Figanière e Morão in his work Memórias das rainhas de Portugal, based on the obituary of the Church of San Bartolomeo in Coimbra, indicates that she died in 1349, a year corroborated by other more recent historians, including Salvador Dias Arnaut, A. H. de Oliveira Marques and Joel Serrão. According to Dias Arnaut, it is most likely that Constanza would have given birth to another daughter, María, named after her older sister, four years after the birth of the infante Fernando, and she died from postpartum consequences. The historian Ana Rodrigues Oliveira says that the most likely date of her death is 27 January 1349. This implies that the relationship between infante Pedro and Inês de Castro began before Constanza's death.

Constanza was initially buried in the Church of Santo Domingo in Santarém and later her son, King Fernando I, ordered that her tomb be transferred to the Monastery of San Francisco in the same city. At the end of the 19th century her tomb could have been transferred to the Archaeological Museum of Carmo in Lisbon. However, it is possible that the one identified as that of Constanza is the one destined for Isabel of Aragon, as part of the royal pantheon project devised by her husband King Denis of Portugal in the Monastery of São Dinis in Odivelas, although in the end the remains of the Holy Queen were buried in the Monastery of Santa Clara-a-Velha.

== Issue ==
Constanza and infante Pedro of Portugal had the following children:

- Maria (6 April 1342 – 1377) who married on 3 February 1354 infante Fernando of Aragón, Marquis of Tortosa and Lord of Albarracín (son of King Alfonso IV of Aragon and his second wife, Eleanor of Castile).
- Luís (born in 1344, lived eight days).
- Fernando I (31 October 1345 – 22 October 1383).
- A daughter, possibly named Maria (born in 1349, died shortly after).

== Bibliography ==
- Caetano de Sousa, Antonio (1735). Historia Genealógica de la Real Casa Portuguesa (PDF) (in Portuguese). Vol. I, books I and II. Lisbon: Lisbon Occidental, na oficina de Joseph Antonio da Sylva. ISBN 978-84-8109-908-9.
- Martin, Therese (2012). Reassessing the Roles of Women As Makers of Medieval Art and Architecture. Brill.
- Pretel Martín, Aurelio; Rodríguez Llopis, Miguel (1998). El señorío de Villena en el siglo XIV (PDF) (in Spanish) (1° ed.). Albacete: Instituto de Estudios Albacetenses. ISBN 978-84-87136-86-3.
- Rodrigues Oliveira, Ana (2010). Rainhas medievais de Portugal. Dezassete mulheres, duas dinastias, quatro séculos de História (in Portuguese). Lisbon: A esfera dos livros. ISBN 978-989-626-261-7.
- Stephens, Henry Morse (1898). Portugal. New York: G.P. Putnam's sons. pp. 92–99.

Constanza Manuel Castilian House of Burgundy Cadet branch of the House of Ivrea Born: circa 1318 Died: 27 January 1349
Royal titles
Vacant Title last held by Constance of Portugal	Queen consort of Castile and León; 1325–1327	Vacant Title next held by Maria of Portugal
