= List of Aragonese royal consorts =

Consorts of the monarchs of Aragon

Aragon arms

This is a list of consorts of the monarchs of the Kingdom and the Crown of Aragon. Blanche II of Navarre and Philip I of Castile died before their spouses inherited the crown.

== Countesses ==
Picture	Name	Father	Birth	Marriage	Became consort	Ceased to be consort	Death	Spouse
	? Iñiguez of Pamplona	Íñigo Arista of Pamplona (Íñiguez)	-	820		-	-	García Galíndez
	Oneca Garcés of Pamplona	García Íñiguez of Pamplona (Íñiguez)	-	-	-	-	-	Aznar Galíndez II
	Acibella Garcés of Gascony	García II Sánchez of Gascony (Gascony)	-	-	-	-		Galindo Aznárez II
	Sancha Garcés of Pamplona	García Jiménez of Pamplona (Jiménez)	-	after 905		-	-	Galindo Aznárez II

== Queens ==
=== House of Aragon ===
Picture	Name	Father	Birth	Marriage	Became consort	Ceased to be consort	Death	Spouse
	Ermesinda of Bigorre	Bernard-Roger, Count of Bigorre (Foix)	-	22 August 1036		1 December 1049		Ramiro I
	Agnes	perhaps William VI or William VII, Duke of Aquitaine (Ramnulfids)	-	1054		8 May 1063 husband's death	-	Ramiro I
	Isabella of Urgell	Ermengol III, Count of Urgell (Barcelona)	-	1065		1071 separated on grounds of consanguinity	1071, before 20 December	Sancho I
	Felicia of Roucy	Hilduin IV, Count of Roucy (Montdidier)	-	1076, or before		4 June 1094 husband's death	3 May 1123	Sancho I
	Agnes of Aquitaine	William VIII, Duke of Aquitaine (Ramnulfids)	-	January 1086	4 June 1094 husband's accession	6 June 1097		Peter I
	Bertha	of Italian origins	-	16 August 1097		28 September 1104 husband's death	before 1111	Peter I
	Urraca of León and Castile	Alfonso VI of León and Castile (Jiménez)	April 1079	October 1109		1115 marriage annulled	8 March 1126	Alfonso I
	Agnes of Aquitaine	William IX, Duke of Aquitaine (Ramnulfids)	late 1103	13 November 1135		13 November 1137 husband abdication	8 March 1160, or before	Ramiro II
	Sancha of Castile	Alfonso VII of Castile (Anscarids)	21 September 1154/5	18 January 1174		25 April 1196 husband's death	9 November 1208	Alfonso II
	Marie of Montpellier	William VIII of Montpellier (Guilhem)	1182	15 June 1204		21 January/18 April 1213		Peter II
	Eleanor of Castile	Alfonso VIII of Castile (Anscarids)	1202	6 February 1221		April 1229 marriage annulled	1244	James I
	Violant of Hungary	Andrew II of Hungary (Árpád)	1215/6	8 September 1235		12 October 1251		James I

Picture	Coat of Arms	Name	Father	Birth	Marriage	Became consort	Ceased to be consort	Death	Spouse
		Constance of Sicily	Manfred of Sicily (Hohenstaufen)	1249	13 June/July 1262	27 July 1276 husband's accession	2/11 November 1285 husband's death	9 April 1302	Peter III
		Isabella of Castile	Sancho IV of Castile (Anscarids)	1283	1 December 1291		25 April 1295 marriage annulled	24 July 1328	James II
		Blanche of Anjou	Charles II of Naples (Anjou-Sicily)	1280	29 October/1 November 1295		14 October 1310		James II
		Marie of Lusignan	Hugh III of Cyprus (Lusignan)	1273	27 November 1315		10/22 April/September 1322		James II
		Elisenda of Montcada	Pedro I of Montcada, Lord of Aitona and Soses (Montcada)	1272	25 December 1322		5 November 1327 husband's death	19 June 1364	James II
		Eleanor of Castile	Ferdinand IV of Castile (Anscarids)	1307	5 February 1329		24 January 1336 husband's death	March/April 1359	Alfonso IV
		Maria of Navarre	Philip III of Navarre (Évreux)	1329–35	23 July 1338		29 April 1347		Peter IV
		Eleanor of Portugal	Afonso IV of Portugal (Burgundy)	3 February 1328	19 November 1347		29 October 1348		Peter IV
		Eleanor of Sicily	Peter II of Sicily (Barcelona)	1325	13 June/27 August 1349		20 April 1375		Peter IV
		Sibila of Fortià	Berenguer of Fortià (Fortià)	1350	11 October 1377		6 January 1387 husband's death	4/24 November 1406	Peter IV
		Yolanda of Bar	Robert I, Duke of Bar (Montbelliard)	1364/5	2 February 1380	6 January 1387 husband's ascension	19 May 1396 husband's death	3 July 1431	John I
		Maria of Luna	Lope, Lord and 1st Count of Luna and Lord of Segorbe (Luna)	1358	13 June 1373	19 May 1396 husband's accession	20/29 December 1406		Martin
		Margaret of Prades	Pedro of Aragon, Baron of Entenza (Barcelona)	1395	17 September 1409		31 May 1410 husband's death	1422	Martin

=== House of Trastámara ===
Picture	Coat of Arms	Name	Father	Birth	Marriage	Became consort	Ceased to be consort	Death	Spouse
		Eleanor of Alburquerque	Sancho Alfonso, 1st Count of Alburquerque (Trastamara)	1374	1393/4	28 June 1412 husband's accession	2 April 1416 husband's death	16 December 1435	Ferdinand I
		Maria of Castile	Henry III of Castile (Trastamara)	1 September 1401	12 June 1415	2 April 1416 husband's accession	4 October 1458		Alfonso V
		Juana Enríquez	Fadrique Enríquez, Count of Melba and Rueda (Enríquez)	1425	1 April 1444	4 October 1458 husband's accession	13 February 1468		John II
		Isabella I of Castile	John II of Castile (Trastámara)	22 April 1451	19 October 1469	20 January 1479 husband's accession	26 November 1504		Ferdinand II
		Germaine of Foix	John of Foix, Viscount of Narbonne (Foix-Grailly)	1488	19 October 1505		23 January 1516 husband's death	18 October 1538	Ferdinand II

==== Consorts of claimants against John II, 1462–1472 ====
During the war against John II, there were three who claimed his throne, though this never included the Kingdom of Valencia. One of the three was Peter V of Aragon who remained a bachelor. The others, Henry IV of Castile and René of Anjou, had wives during their "reigns" as pretenders. The wife of Henry IV was Joan of Portugal, a Portuguese infanta daughter of King Edward of Portugal and his wife Eleanor of Aragon. The first wife of Rene died prior to 1462; his second wife was Jeanne de Laval, a French noblewoman and daughter Guy XIV de Laval, Count of Laval and Isabella of Brittany.

=== House of Habsburg ===
Picture	Coat of Arms	Name	Father	Birth	Marriage	Became consort	Ceased to be consort	Death	Spouse
		Isabella of Portugal	Manuel I of Portugal (Aviz)	24 October 1503	11 March 1526		1 May 1539		Charles I

In 1556, the union of the Spanish kingdoms is generally called Spain and Mary I of England (second wife of Philip II) is the first Queen of Spain. Philip II was son of Charles I and Isabella of Portugal.

== Princes ==
Picture	Coat of Arms	Name	Father	Birth	Marriage	Became consort	Ceased to be consort	Death	Spouse
		Ramon Berenguer IV	Ramon Berenguer III (Barcelona)	c. 1114	August 1150		6 August 1162		Petronilla

== See also ==
- List of Hispanic consorts
- List of Majorcan consorts
- Countess of Barcelona
- List of Castilian consorts
- List of Asturian consorts
- List of Castilian monarchs
- List of Galician monarchs
- List of Leonese consorts
- List of Navarrese consorts
- List of Spanish consorts
- Princess of Girona
