= Constance of Aragon, Princess of Villena =

Aragonese princess

Constance of Aragon
- Born: 4 April 1300; Valencia
- Died: 19 October 1327 (aged 27); Castillo de Garcimuñoz
- Noble family: House of Barcelona
- Spouse: Juan Manuel, Prince of Villena
- Issue: Constanza, Queen of Castile
- Father: James II of Aragon
- Mother: Blanche of Anjou

Constance of Aragon (4 April 1300 – 19 October 1327) (sometimes called Constanza) was an Aragonese princess by birth and the princess of Villena by marriage. She was the daughter of King James II of Aragon and his second wife Blanche of Anjou, a Neapolitan princess. She was also the maternal grandmother of King Ferdinand I of Portugal through her daughter Constance.

== Biography ==
Constance was born on April 4, 1300. She was the fourth daughter of James II of Aragon, son of King Peter III of Aragon and Queen Constance II of Sicily, and Blanche of Anjou, daughter of King Charles II of Naples and princess Maria of Hungary. She had many siblings, including Alfonso IV of Aragon.

At the age of six, she was engaged to Juan Manuel, Prince of Villena. They were married six years later. She was his second wife, as he had been previously married to Elizabeth of Majorca. She lived in Villena Castle after her engagement and prior to her marriage. She died in 1327.

== Marriage and descendants ==
She married Juan Manuel, Prince of Villena in 1312. They had three children:

- Constance of Villena, married firstly King Alfonso XI of Castile and secondly the future King Peter I of Portugal, at the time the heir to the Portuguese throne
- Beatrice of Villena, died young
- Manuel of Villena, died young

== Ancestry ==
Ancestors of Constance of Aragon, Princess of Villena

8. James I of Aragon
4. Peter III of Aragon
9. Violant of Hungary
2. James II of Aragon
10. Manfred of Sicily
5. Constance II of Sicily
11. Beatrice of Savoy
1. Constance of Aragon
12. Charles I of Anjou
6. Charles II of Naples
13. Beatrice of Provence
3. Blanche of Anjou
14. Stephen V of Hungary
7. Mary of Hungary
15. Elizabeth of Terteroba
