= James of Aragon =

James of Aragon may refer to:

- James I of Aragon (1208–1276),
- James II of Aragon (1267–1327)
- James of Aragon (monk) (1296–1334), eldest child of King James II
