= Philip of Taranto =

Philip of Taranto may refer to:

- Philip I, Prince of Taranto (died 1331)
- Philip, Despot of Romania (died 1331)
- Philip II, Prince of Taranto (died 1374)
