= Juan III =

Juan III is the name of:

- John of Aragon (patriarch) (1304–1334), archbishop of Toledo under the name Juan III
- Prince Juan, Count of Montizón (1822–1887), Carlist pretender to the throne of Spain
- Infante Juan, Count of Barcelona (1913–1993), third surviving son and designated heir of King Alfonso XIII of Spain and Victoria Eugenie of Battenberg.
