= Philip of Anjou (disambiguation) =

Philip of Anjou or Philip V of Spain (1683–1746) was a king of Spain.

Philip of Anjou may also refer to:

- Philip of Sicily (1255/56 – 1277), second son of King Charles of Sicily
- Philip I, Prince of Taranto (1278–1331)
- Philip II, Prince of Taranto (1329–1373)
- Philip, Despot of Romania (d. 1331)
