= Elisenda of Montcada =

Queen of Aragon from 1322 to 1327

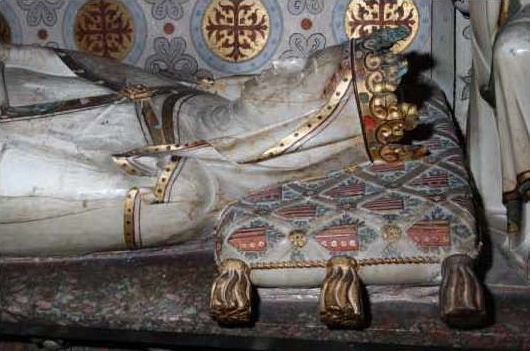

Queen consort of Aragon
- Tenure: 1322–1327
- Born: 1292
- Died: 19 July 1364 (aged 71–72); Monastery of Pedralbes
- Burial: Monastery of Pedralbes
- Spouse: James II of Aragon (m. 1322)
- House: Montcada
- Father: Pedro II de Moncada
- Mother: Elisenda de Pinós

Elisenda de Montcada (c. 1292 – 19 June 1364) was queen consort of Aragon as the fourth and last spouse of James II of Aragon. She served as Regent or "Queen-Lieutenant" of Aragon during the absence of her spouse from 1324 until 1327. She and James II founded the Monastery of Pedralbes, a Franciscan convent of the Poor Clares. After James II's death in 1327, Elisenda lived adjacent to the monastery for the remaining 37 years of her life.

== Early life ==
Coat of Arms

Elisenda de Montcada was believed to have been born in Aitona, the daughter of Pedro II de Moncada, Baron of Aitona, and Elisenda de Pinós. She belonged to the lineage of Montcada, one of the most noble families of Catalonia, close with the monarchy. Elisenda had three brothers: Ot, heir to Aitona and a godfather of the future Peter IV of Aragon; Gastó, bishop of Huesca and later of Girona; and Guillem Ramón. Elisenda's great-grandmother was Constance, Lady of Aitona, an illegitimate daughter of Peter II of Aragon, making her and her husband second cousins once removed.

== Queen and regent ==
After James II was a widower by his third wife, Maria of Cyprus, he hurried to contract a new marriage. Just a month after the death of the unhappy queen, he went to obtain a dispensation of consanguinity in the third or fourth grade to arrange new nuptials. The king did not indicate the name of the chosen, but it was Elisenda of Montcada. The monarch seemed very animated with the idea and openly hastened the proceedings that were taken.

Her marriage to James II took place in Tarragona on 25 December 1322. The king endowed the bride with income from Berga, Burriana, Tortosa, Morella, Torroella de Montgri, and Pals, and her brother Ot with the locations of Seròs and Mequinensa. She was 30 and he, who was widowed in 1319/1322, (Note: The year of death for Maria of Cyprus (Marie of Lusignan) varies in references from 1319 to 1322; as a result the interval before James II's marriage to Elisenda ranges from 3 years to just a few months.) was about 55. She thus became stepmother to James' ten children by his second marriage to Blanche of Anjou; they had no children of their own. She favored the grandson of James II, the future Peter the Ceremonious.

They settled in the royal palace in Barcelona and led a relatively quiet life. She intervened in the affairs of state, giving advice as the other queens had done. The queen was described as mature, educated, beautiful, and very pious, and the day to day at the royal court as cordial, despite the rigidity and severity of James himself. From 1324, she acted as regent during his absence from Aragon. The marriage lasted for five years before James died in November 1327.

Jesus Ernest Martinez Ferrando wrote: "Elisenda, for her feminine qualities, for her exquisite religiosity, was the best sedative that the monarch could find in the bitterness of his last years; dialogue with the devoted wife sweetened their hours of spiritual and physical ordeal; it can be said that Elisenda helped James II to die well. As death approached - as observed in the mentioned biography – it was established between the two spouses 'a mutual religious delight'".

The new queen chose Barcelona and its Palau Reial Major as her usual residence, even though Tortosa was in the midst of her dowry and its castle was the residence of her predecessors, the queens Blanca of Anjou and Maria of Cyprus, for extended periods. Because they had no children and the king soon became ill, Elisenda devoted her life to her religious practices and the exercise of charity.

== Construction of the Monastery of Pedralbes ==
Elisenda eventually became interested in the foundation of a monastery of the Order of the Poor Clares around Barcelona. Once she expressed this desire, the king hurried to please her, even though there was already Vilafranca del Penedès, a monastery of Poor Clares founded by Blanca of Anjou, his second wife. He only placed one condition – that the monastery was to be erected in honor of the mother of God. At first it was designated to be located at the site of Valldaura, between Cerdanyola and Montcada, but then it was decided on a place called Pedralbes due to the amount of white stone extracted from an existing quarry.

In 1326 work began on the monastery in Pedralbes; the management and construction advanced rapidly. Perhaps James II sensed his death and wanted the mystical enthusiasm of his wife to become a reality as soon as possible. After a year the basic structure of the monastery was done: they could use the cloister, and the church and housing for the nuns were almost finished as well. On 3 May 1327 fourteen nuns entered the monastery and they elected the first abbess, Sobirana d’Olzet.

In a will which he wrote just a few months before his death, the king ratified, among other things, donations on income made to his wife. In addition he left her the gold crown that he had purchased at the time of the wedding and many other jewels, fine fabrics and tablecloths and dishes crafted with gold and silver.

Elisenda was widowed in November 1327. She ordered a small palace to be built next to, but completely separate from, the monastery. She lived there for the remaining 37 years of her life. Although she was never a nun, Elisenda was endowed with broad powers over the internal workings of the monastery. She participated actively in the decision making of the religious community and put special emphasis on obtaining several privileges for the monastery. For example, it was under the direct protection of the city of Barcelona through the Consell de Cent, the managing body of the city, which was committed to defend the monastery in the event of danger. It was also her intention was to have Pedralbes be the most favored monastery so it would not face economic difficulty after she died, quite common in the female monasteries. During these years royal donations nearly drowned the Franciscan spirit of the convent life.

Elisenda managed the construction of the buildings and their ornamentation. Painters, like Ferrer Bassa and the Serra brothers, were contracted to beautify the monastery. Elisenda also promoted the paintings in the chapel of St. Michael, which were ordered by the abbess Francesca Saportella, her niece.

Although she stayed at the monastery, she did participate in some official regnal events, such as the transfer of the remains of Saint Eulalia to the Cathedral in Barcelona, when she accompanied Maria of Navarre, wife of Peter IV of Aragon, and Constance of Aragon, wife of James III of Mallorca.

== Archaeology ==
In May 2026, archaeologists and researchers examining eight 14th-century tombs at the Royal Monastery of Santa Maria de Pedralbes confirmed that the sepulchre of Queen Elisenda de Montcada contained her remains within a medieval wooden coffin and revealed evidence of an austere burial associated with monastic traditions. The investigation analyzed the remains of 25 individuals using archaeological, anthropological, genetic, and botanical methods, leading to the identification of tomb reuse, reopened burials, and funerary practices including textile wrappings and plant offerings. Researchers also found that several tombs contained individuals different from those traditionally attributed to them, including burials of women and children in sepulchres historically assigned to male nobles.

== Death and burial ==
Elisenda's will was issued on 11 April 1364 and she died on 19 July of that year. She bequeathed everything to the monastery as her primary heir, except for some goods destined for institutions, relatives, or acquaintances. She requested that they raze the palace where she lived, which was done immediately. The inventory that was made of her room demonstrates the simplicity in which she lived, despite the jewels and fine fabrics that she gifted.

The tomb of the Queen was constructed in the Catalan Gothic style, artistically representing her double life. The bifrontal tomb is located along a wall that separates the church from the cloister, with unique presentations on each side. From the church, Elisenda is portrayed as a queen wearing her crown, and from the cloister she is dressed as an austere widow or nun.

== Legacy ==
The Monastery of Pedralbes is Elisenda's most significant legacy. It is a national monument, and is open to the public.

Elisenda's portrait is part of the Gallery of Illustrious Catalans at the Barcelona City Council.

Passeig de Reina Elisenda de Montcada is a street named after her in the Sarrià neighborhood of Barcelona, as is the associated Reina Elisenda station of line L12 of the Barcelona Metro. The station is 0.7 km northeast of the monastery.

== Notes ==
Elisenda of Montcada House of Montcada Born: circa 1292 Died: 19 July 1364
Royal titles
Vacant Title last held by Marie of Lusignan	Queen consort of Aragon; 1322–1327	Vacant Title next held by Eleanor of Castile
