= Monastery of Pedralbes =

Gothic monastery in Barcelona, Catalonia, Spain

Coordinates: 41°23′44″N 2°06′44″E

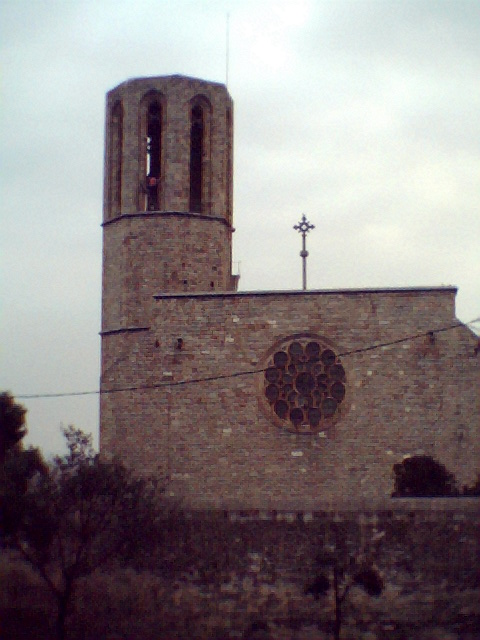
West end of the church with its rose window and octagonal belltower, Pedralbes Convent.

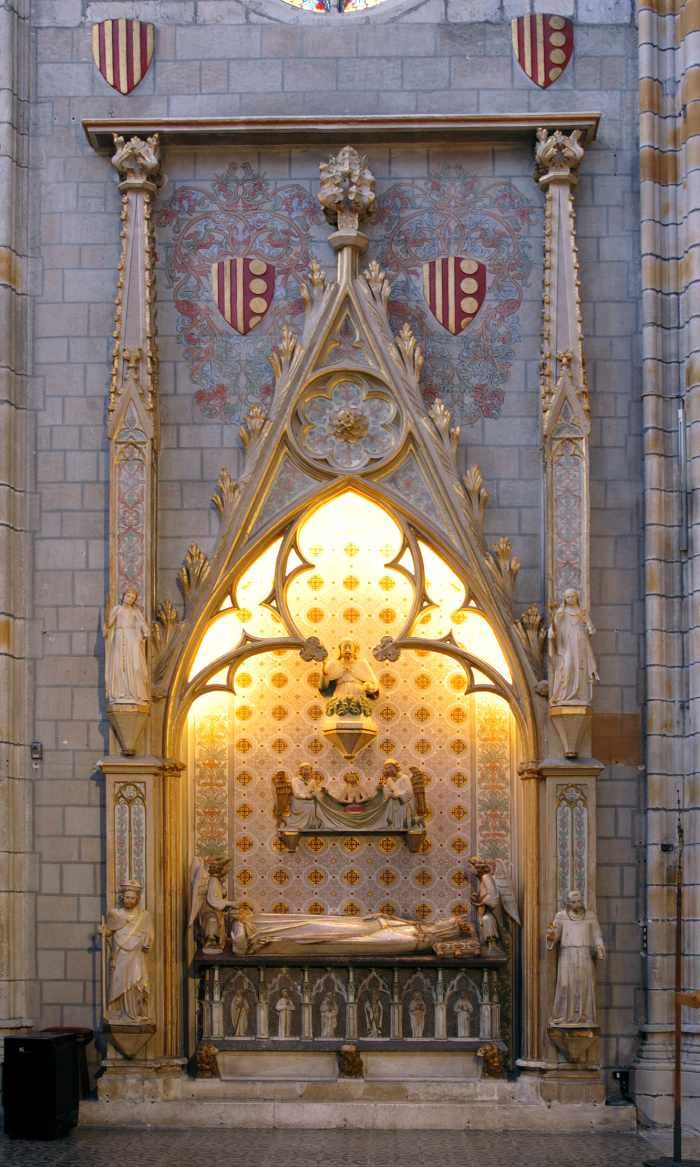
Tomb of Elisenda de Montcada.

The Monastery of Pedralbes (Monestir de Pedralbes), otherwise the Royal Monastery of Santa Maria de Pedralbes is a Gothic convent in Barcelona, Catalonia, Spain. It is now a museum, housing permanent exhibitions on its own art and legacy as well as third-party special exhibitions from time to time. The Chapel of St. Michael was restored and re-opened in 2018.

== Etymology ==
The name of the site in the 14th century was Petras Albas (in the accusative), Latin for "white stones". The original name devolved into the current one.

== History ==
The monastery was founded by King James II of Aragon for his wife Elisenda de Montcada in 1326. It housed a community of Poor Clares, mostly members of noble families. The queen gave the monastery a series of privileges, including the direct protection of the city of Barcelona, through the Consell de Cent ("Council of the Hundred"), who had the task to defend it in case of danger. Elisenda also built a palace annexed to the monastery, where she lived after her husband's death in 1327. She died there in 1367. The remains of the palace were discovered in the 1970s.

During the Reapers' War of the 1640s and '50s, the nuns were expelled, but later returned. Some still reside in the complex, which was declared a national monument in 1991.

== Structure ==
Originally, the monastery (built in white stone, pedres albes in Catalan, hence its name) was defended by a line of walls, of which today only two towers and one gate remain.

The church has a single nave, with rib vaults and a polygonal apse, and houses a Gothic retable by Jaume Huguet. The façade is characterized by a large rose window.

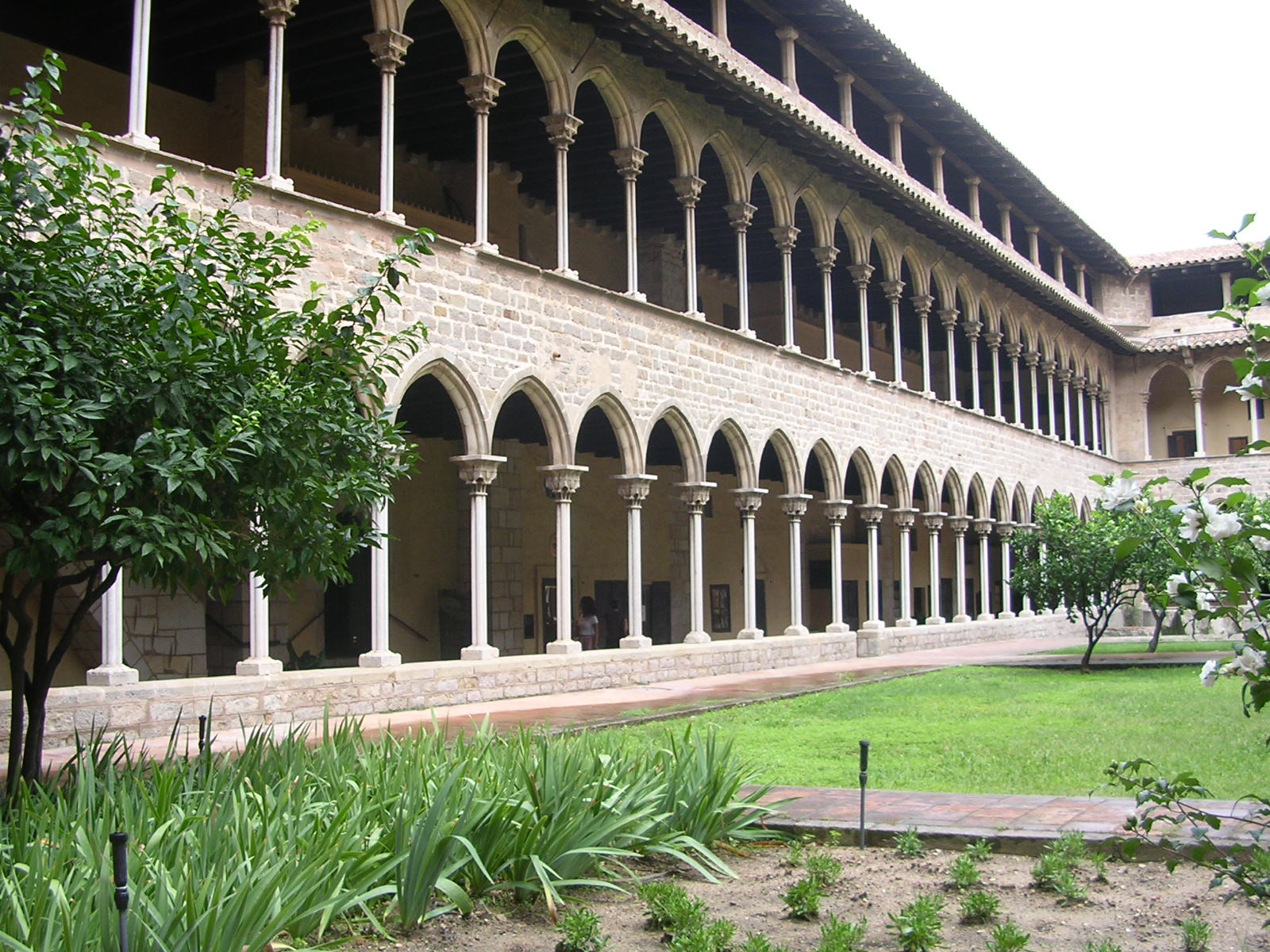
View of the cloister.

The cloister has three floors, and a length of 40 meters, with a central garden of orange trees and palms. It is formed by wide arches on columns, whose capitals are decorated with the emblems of the Kings of Aragon and the House of Montcada. The sepulchre of Queen Elisenda, in alabaster stone, is located in one of the cloister's wings.

Also notable is the Chapel of St. Michael, housing several fresco paintings by Ferrer Bassa. Dating to 1346, they show the influence of the Italian painter Giotto.

In the 1990s, the former dormitory housed a permanent exhibition of works from the Thyssen-Bornemisza Collection, with works by Italian Trecento painters, and later works by artists including Rubens, Canaletto, Tintoretto, Velázquez and Fra Angelico (Virgin of Humility, one of his masterpieces). Now these are in the Museu Nacional d'Art de Catalunya in Barcelona, or the main Madrid home of the collection.

== Notable people ==
- Isaura Marcos Sánchez (born 1959), cloistered nun and photographer

== See also ==
- Maritime Museum of Barcelona

== Sources ==
- Escudero i Ribot, Maria Assumpta; Josep Mainar (1976). El mueble catalán en el Monasterio de Pedralbes. Barcelona: Ajuntament de Barcelona, Museu Nacional d'Art de Catalunya.
- SANJUST i LATORRE, Cristina (2010). L'Obra del Reial Monestir de Santa Maria de Pedralbes des de la seva fundació fins al segle XVI: un monestir reial per a l'orde de les clarisses a Catalunya. Barcelona: Promocions i Publicacions Universitàries; [Bellaterra]: Universitat Autònoma de Barcelona: Institut d'Estudis Món Juïc.
