= Blanche of Anjou =

Queen of Aragon from 1295 to 1310

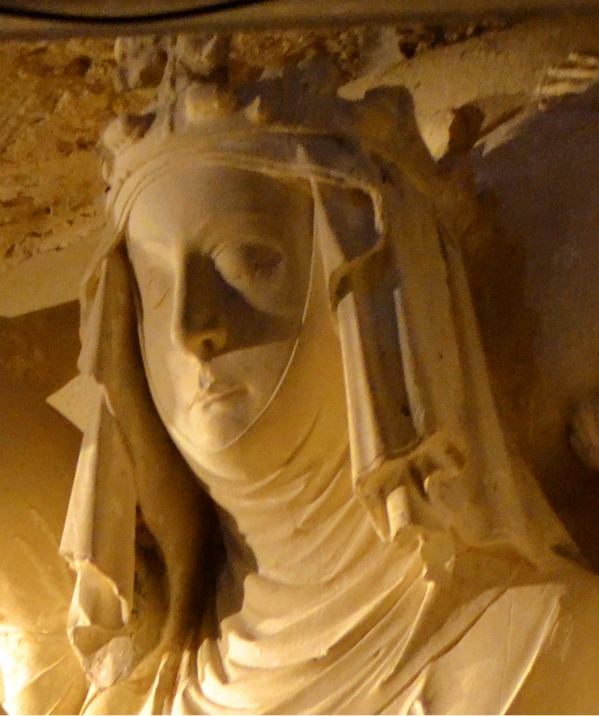

Queen consort of Aragon
- Tenure: 1295–1310
- Coronation: 1296 (Zaragoza)
- Born: 1280
- Died: 14 October 1310 (aged 29–30); Barcelona
- Burial: Santes Creus
- Spouse: James II of Aragon (m. 1295)
- Issue among others: James; Alfonso IV, King of Aragon; Maria, Lady of Cameros; Constance, Princess of Villena; John; Isabella, Queen of Germany; Peter, Count of Ribagorza
- House: Anjou-Sicily
- Father: Charles II of Naples
- Mother: Mary of Hungary
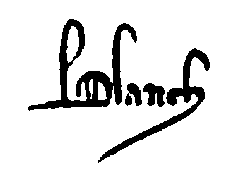
- Signature

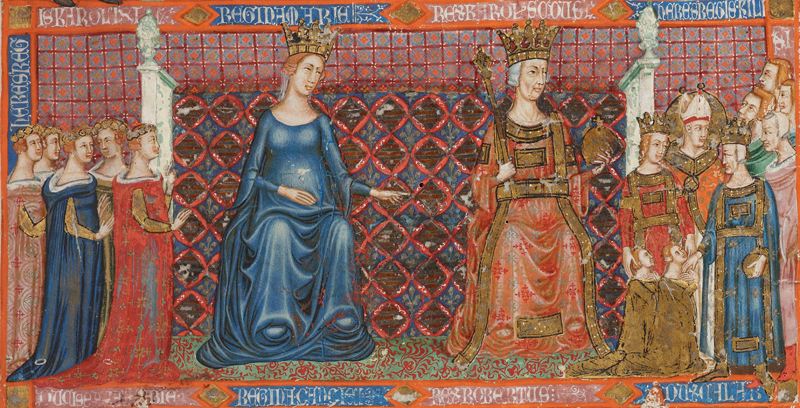
Blanche and her family in Bible of Naples

Blanche of Anjou (1280 – 14 October 1310) was Queen of Aragon as the second wife of King James II of Aragon. She was a member of the Capetian House of Anjou and is also known as Blanche of Naples (Blanca de Nàpols). She served as Regent or "Queen-Lieutenant" of Aragon during the absence of her husband in 1310.

== Life ==
Blanche was the daughter of King Charles II of Naples and Mary of Hungary. Among her siblings were King Robert I of Naples, Saint Louis of Toulouse, Philip I of Taranto (titular Emperor of Constantinople), Charles Martel of Anjou (titular King of Hungary), Queen Eleanor of Sicily, and Queen Maria of Naples. She was originally betrothed in 1290 to John I, Marquess of Montferrat. Her father was helping him defend Montferrat, hoping to make John his vassal. However, the engagement was broken off and John died childless in 1305.

The new Pope Boniface VIII, elected in 1294 at Naples under the auspices of King Charles, mediated between the latter and James II of Aragon, and the Treaty of Anagni was signed: James was to marry Blanche and was promised the investiture, by the pope, of Sardinia and Corsica, while he was to leave the Angevin a free hand in Sicily and even to assist him if the Sicilians resisted.

Blanche died on the 14 October 1310, during her regency in the absence of James. Her death was probably linked to the birth of her daughter Violante, who was born in October 1310. Blanche was buried at Santes Creus. She was survived by her husband, children and mother.

== Issue ==
On 29 October or 1 November 1295 at Vilabertran, Blanche and James were married. They had ten children:

- James of Aragon (1296–1334). James renounced his right to the throne in 1319 to become a monk. He refused to give the kiss of peace during his wedding to Eleanor of Castile, and further refused to consummate the marriage. Eleanor later became the second wife of his younger brother Alfonso.
- Alfonso IV of Aragon (1299–1336). He became the King of Aragon in 1327 and ruled until his death. He married twice: first to Teresa d'Entença and then to Eleanor of Castile after his first wife died.
- Maria of Aragon (1299–1316). She married Infante Peter of Castile, son of Sancho IV of Castile.
- Constance of Aragon (1300–1327). Constance married Juan Manuel, Prince of Villena, nephew of Alfonso X of Castile.
- Isabella of Aragon (1302–1330), she married Frederick I of Austria.
- John of Aragon (1304–1334). John became the first Archbishop of Toledo and Tarragona in 1318, and Patriarch of Alexandria in 1328.
- Peter of Aragon (1305–1381), Count of Ribagorça and Prades. Peter married Jeanne, daughter of Gaston I of Foix. Peter was the father of Eleanor of Aragon, Queen of Cyprus.
- Blanche (1307–1348), Prioress of Sixena.
- Ramon Berenguer (1308–1366), Count of Empúries and Baron of Ejerica. Ramon married firstly Blanca, daughter of Philip I of Taranto, and secondly Maria, daughter of Jaime of Aragon.
- Violante of Aragon (1310–1353). She first married Philip, Despot of Romania, son of Philip I of Taranto. Her second marriage was to Lope de Luna, Lord of Segorbe.

== Sources ==
- Reilly, Bernard F. (1993). The Medieval Spains. Cambridge University Press.
- Runciman, Steven (2000). The Sicilian Vespers: A History of the Mediterranean World in the Later Thirteenth Century. Cambridge University Press.
- Stober, Karen (2013). "Monks and Politics in Thirteenth Century Wales and Catalonia". In Burton, Janet; Schofield, Phillipp; Weiler, Bjö (eds.). Thirteenth Century England XIV: Proceedings of the Aberystwyth and Lampeter. The Boydell Press.

Blanche of Anjou Capetian House of Anjou Cadet branch of the House of Capet Born: circa 1280 Died: 14 October 1310
Royal titles
Preceded by Isabella of Castile	Queen consort of Sicily; 1295–1296	Succeeded by Eleanor of Anjou
Preceded by Isabella of Castile	Queen consort of Aragon; 1295–1310	Succeeded by Maria of Lusignan
New title	Queen consort of Sardinia and Corsica; 1297–1310	Succeeded by Maria of Lusignan
