= Marie of Lusignan, Queen of Aragon =

Queen of Aragon from 1315 to 1319

Marie of Lusignan
- Arms as Queen Consort

Queen consort of Aragon
- Tenure: 1315–1319
- Born: 1273; Cyprus
- Died: April 1319 (aged 45–46); Tortosa
- Spouse: James II of Aragon (m. 1315)
- House: Poitiers-Lusignan
- Father: Hugh III of Cyprus
- Mother: Isabella of Ibelin

Marie of Lusignan (1273 – Tortosa, April 1319) was a daughter of Hugh III of Cyprus and his wife Isabella of Ibelin. She was Queen of Aragon by her marriage and was a member of the House of Poitiers-Lusignan.

== Life ==
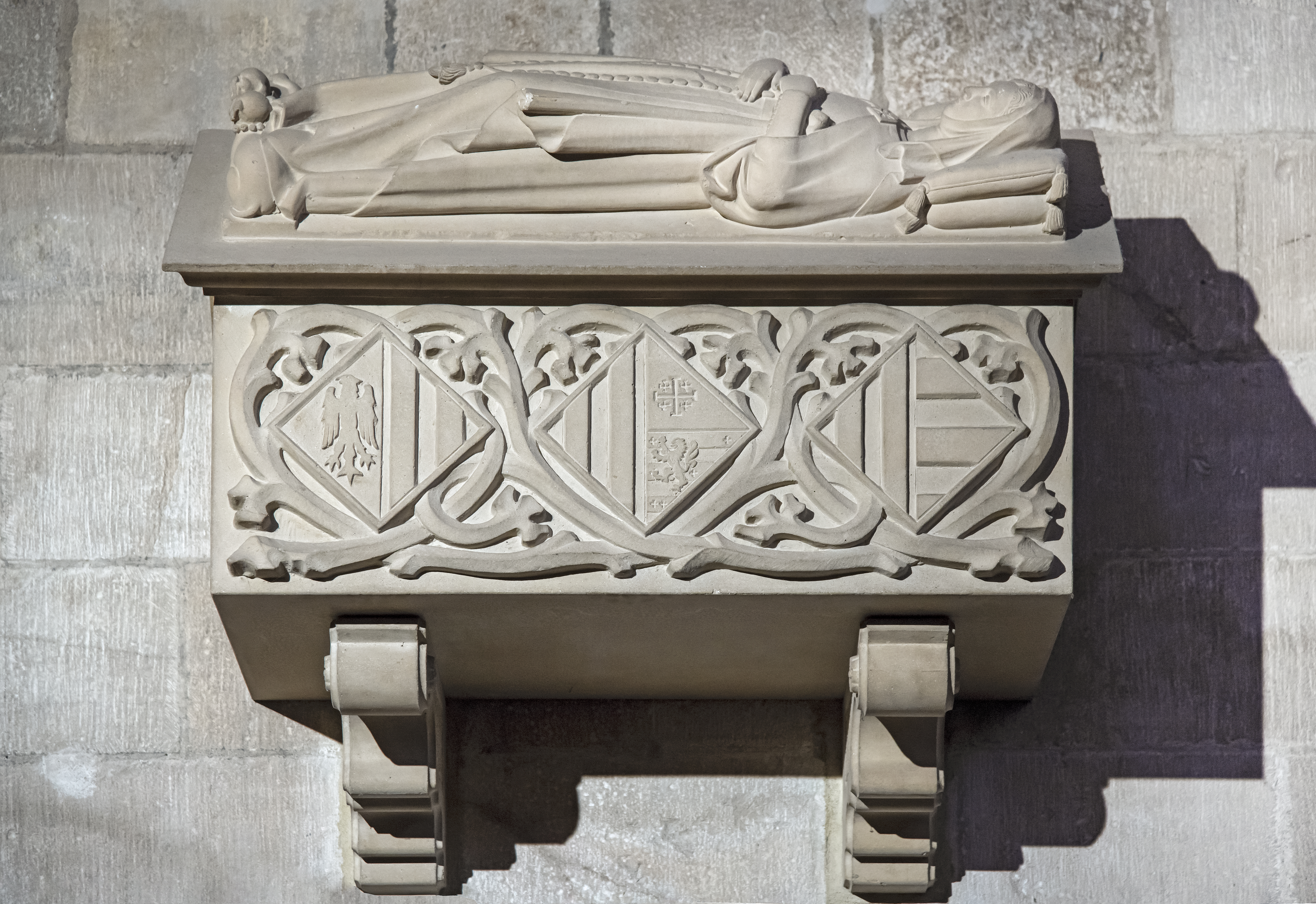
Her grave.

Marie was the fifth of thirteen children. Her siblings included John II of Jerusalem, Henry II of Jerusalem and Amalric, Lord of Tyre.

Marie remained unmarried for many years; she was recorded as having been present in her brother Amalric's court in 1310. She was betrothed to James II of Aragon in 1315, who had been married twice before and was father to ten legitimate children.

As Marie was heiress to Cyprus, James considered a matrimonial union with her to be politically advantageous. They married by proxy at Santa Sophia, Nicosia on 15 June 1315 and in person at Girona on 27 November 1315. Marie was already forty-two and the marriage was purely for reasons of state, so James could rule Cyprus on the death of Marie's brother Henry. They had no children.

The couple were only married for four years before Marie died in Tortosa in April 1319. As Marie did not outlive her brother, James's plans of ruling Cyprus had failed. After her death James complained that she had been too old and had not proved companionable. Henry died five years later and was succeeded by their nephew Hugh. James remarried a final time to Elisenda of Montcada before his death in 1327.

Marie of Lusignan, Queen of Aragon House of Lusignan Born: 1273 Died: April 1319
Royal titles
| Preceded by Blanche of Anjou | Queen consort of Aragon; 1314–1319 | Succeeded by Elisenda of Montcada |
