= Eleanor of Castile (1307–1359) =

Queen consort of Aragon from 1329 to 1336

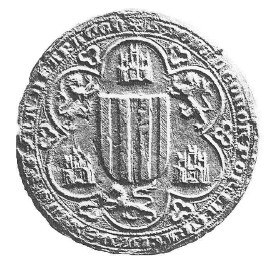
- Seal of Queen Eleanor, ca. 1330.

Queen consort of Aragon
- Tenure: 5 February 1329 – 24 January 1336
- Born: 1307
- Died: 1359 (aged 51–52)
- Spouse: Alfonso IV of Aragon
- Issue: Ferdinand, Marquis of Tortosa; John, Lord of Elche
- House: Castilian House of Ivrea
- Father: Ferdinand IV of Castile
- Mother: Constance of Portugal

Eleanor of Castile (1307–1359) was Queen of Aragon as the wife of King Alfonso IV from 1329 until 1336.

== Betrothal ==
Eleanor was the eldest child and daughter of King Ferdinand IV of Castile by his wife, Constance of Portugal. At the age of four Eleanor was engaged to James, the eldest son and heir apparent of King James II of Aragon, through the agreements reached in the Meeting of Calatayud of 1311 between Ferdinand IV of Castile and James II. The marriage between Maria, daughter of James II, with Peter, brother of Ferdinand IV, was celebrated at the same time. Shortly after, Eleanor was sent to the Aragonese court to be raised there as the future queen. When she was five years old, in September 1312, King Ferdinand IV died. A year later, in November 1313, Queen Constance died as well. Eleanor's grandmother, Maria de Molina, ruled on behalf of Eleanor's young brother, King Alfonso XI of Castile.

The young James, despite his betrothal to Eleanor, was eager to receive the sacred orders and to enter a monastery. Pope John XXII intervened to remind James of his duties. In view of the situation, King James II and his son, whose relationship was strained due to the reluctance of the latter to fulfill his court obligations, signed a document before a notary in October 1319, on the eve of the marriage ceremony, where the younger James promised to marry. Later, in an interview between father and son, both agreed that the young James should be only present at the bridal mass, which would be officiated in the city of Gandesa, but leaving undiscussed the question of whether the marriage should be consummated, given his opposition to the consummation, and taking into account that the commitments with the Kingdom of Castile and León only forced the celebration of the marriage.

== Failed unions ==
On 18 October 1319 the wedding ceremony between James of Aragon and Eleanor of Castile took place. James, according to the chronicles of the time, refused to give the kiss of peace during the ceremony, and James II had to do it. After the ceremony, officiated by the Archbishop of Tarragona, the bridegroom again transmitted to his father his desire to renounce his rights to the throne and enter a convent. After the wedding ceremony, and after a discussion with his father, he fled on horseback, leaving his wife abandoned, and in December 1319, renounced his rights to the throne of Aragon in the Convent of San Francisco of Tarragona. Immediately, he took the habit of the Knights Hospitaller in the Convent of Santo Domingo of the same city.

Alfonso, King James II's younger son, was proclaimed heir apparent. The rejection of Eleanor could have caused serious diplomatic incidents between the Castilian and Aragonese courts. James II informed Eleanor's grandmother, Queen Maria, about his regret for the actions of his eldest son, incomprehensible to him. During the spring of 1320 Eleanor remained lodged in the city of Tortosa; during her stay there, James II and Alfonso became aware that the younger James planned to recover his wife and his rights to the throne, and the conspiracy was thwarted by his father.

After her stay in Tortosa, Eleanor lived in the cities of Zaragoza, Calatayud and Ateca, from where some Castilian ricohombres returned her to the Kingdom of Castile and León. Once in her homeland, Eleanor retired to the Abbey of Santa María la Real de Las Huelgas, although she never took the veil. In early 1325, King Edward II of England proposed the marriage of his eldest son, Edward, with Eleanor, and sent his proxies to negotiate the terms of the wedding by charter dated 6 February 1325. The union never took place due to Edward's deposition.

== Queenship ==
In Ágreda in January 1329 the betrothal between Eleanor and King Alfonso IV of Aragon was signed, and the wedding ceremony took place one month later, on 5 February in the Church of San Miguel de Tarazona. The ceremony was attended by King Alfonso XI of Castile and King James II's children, Maria, John, Peter and Ramón Berenguer. Alfonso IV gave his new wife the city of Huesca and other villages and castles belonging to the Aragonese crown. This marriage improved relations between Castile and Aragon in a renewed alliance formed with the aim of reconquering Granada. The Kingdom of Aragon had breached several marriage agreements, returning to Castile several princesses after breaking off engagements, and this union put an end to the practice.

Eleanor became a disruptive influence in Aragon, plotting to advance the interests of her own sons over those of her stepson, Peter, born from Alfonso IV's first marriage with Teresa d'Entença, Countess of Urgell, who died in 1327. She convinced her husband to consent to make significant territorial donations to the children born to them, Ferdinand and John. Alfonso IV was generous and on 28 December 1329, he granted Ferdinand the Marquisate of Tortosa and the cities of Albarracín, Orihuela, Callosa, Guardamar, Alicante, Monforte, Elda, La Mola, Novelda and Aspe. Eleanor's younger son John also received several lordships: Elche, Biel and Bolsa.

These donations made by Alfonso IV diminished the territorial patrimony of the crown and mainly affected Peter, producing a climate of resentment in the Aragonese court. Because of this the nobility was divided into two camps. One of the two sides was in favor of Queen Eleanor and her sons, and the other defended the prerogatives of Peter and his full siblings. When the King granted his son Ferdinand the cities of Xàtiva, Alzira, Sagunto, Morella, Borriana and Castellón de la Plana, all located in the Kingdom of Valencia, the local subjects protested, and for this reason the King decided to revoke these last donations.

They had the following children:

- Ferdinand (1329–1363), Marquis of Tortosa and Lord of Albarracín and Fraga; married Maria, daughter of Peter I of Portugal, and was killed by order of his brother Peter IV.
- John (1331–1358), Lord of Elche, Biel and Bolsa, married in 1355 to Isabel Núñez de Lara (daughter of Juan Núñez III de Lara) and was killed by order of his cousin Pedro of Castile.

== Widowhood ==
After the death of Alfonso IV, which occurred in the city of Barcelona on 24 January 1336, Queen Eleanor fled to the Kingdom of Castile and León, accompanied by his two sons, Ferdinand and John, fearing the new King Peter IV of Aragon, who was resentful of his stepmother and half-brothers, because of the postponement suffered since the second marriage of his father.

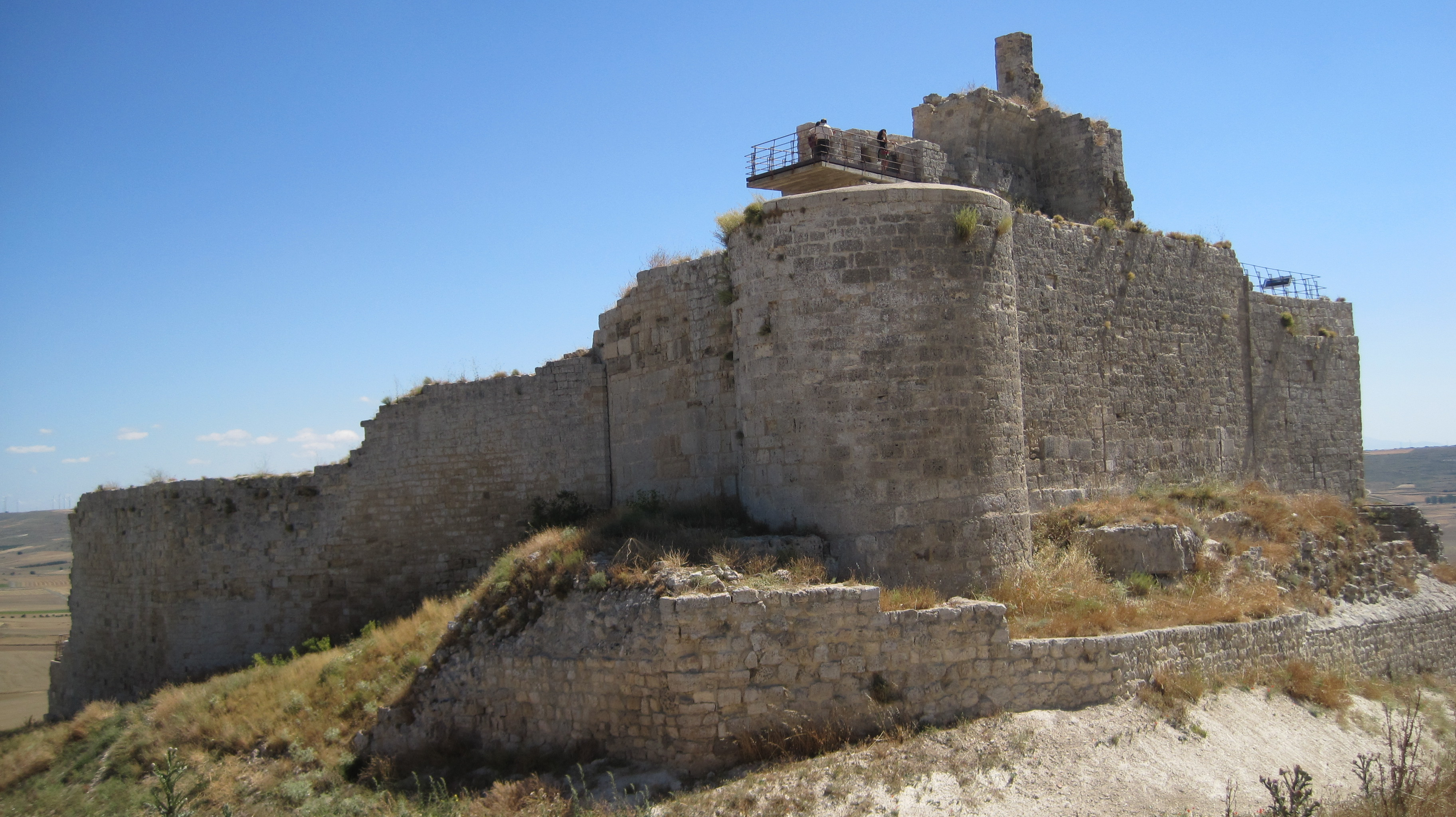
Castle of Castrojeriz, Burgos.

In his testament, written in the Monastery of Poblet in August 1333, Alfonso IV bequeathed to his second wife all her jewels and confirmed the possession of the cities that he had given to her in occasion of their wedding, while bequeathing their oldest son Ferdinand the Marquisates of Tortosa and Albarracín. When she escaped to the kingdom of Castile, Eleanor took with her great quantities of gold, silver and jewels, although King Peter IV tried to prevent her and her sons from leaving the Kingdom of Aragon. At first, the new monarch moved to confiscate Eleanor's revenues and prosecute her protector Pedro de Ejérica, but in 1338 he confirmed her and her sons in possession of their domains, not wishing to antagonise Castile at a time when the whole Iberian Peninsula was threatened by a new Moorish invasion.

Once in Castile, Eleanor continued with her disruptive behavior, this time against her nephew King Peter I. Her youngest son, John of Aragon, was assassinated in Bilbao on 12 June 1358 by order of his cousin the Castilian sovereign, and one year later (March/April 1359), she was murdered in the castle of Castrojeriz by order of her nephew. Four years later, in 1363, her oldest son, Ferdinand of Aragon, was assassinated in Burriana by order of his half-brother, King Peter IV.

== Burial ==
There is controversy about the final whereabouts of the remains of Queen Eleanor of Castile. There are three places that adjudge the possession of its remains:

- the Old Cathedral of Lleida
- Church of Nuestra Señora del Manzano, Castrojeriz
- the Abbey of Santa María la Real de Las Huelgas, place of burial of numerous members of the Castilian-Leonese royalty.

In the Abbey of Santa María la Real de Las Huelgas was conserved a white marble tomb, placed in the side of the Epistle or of Saint John, that measures 2.25 meters long by 0.67 of width, with cover of limestone, and in which it is affirmed that Queen Eleanor of Castile was buried, although in the epitaph carved in the tomb appeared the name of María of Almenara, also called María of Urgel, daughter of Ermengol VI, Count of Urgell. In its interior are five skulls and bones, as well as coffin boards and pieces of kid or sheepskin leather from the linings that covered them. It has been assumed that Queen Eleanor was buried in the tombstone of María of Almenara, whose mortal remains could be transferred to another tomb placed in the same nave, and inside which a female mummy, corpulent and of mature age. The tomb which is supposed to contain the remains of Queen Eleanor was trimmed for being too long and wide. On one side of the tomb is the dead woman depicted on her deathbed, and two angels carrying her soul to heaven. To the sides, in arches on columns of twisted shaft, four bishops with miter and staff, and several personages. Below, a series of dogs chasing harpies, and dragons biting. On the other slope of the sepulcher appear vegetal scrolls and, in the corner, between rosettes that separate the words, it appears sculpted the epitaph.

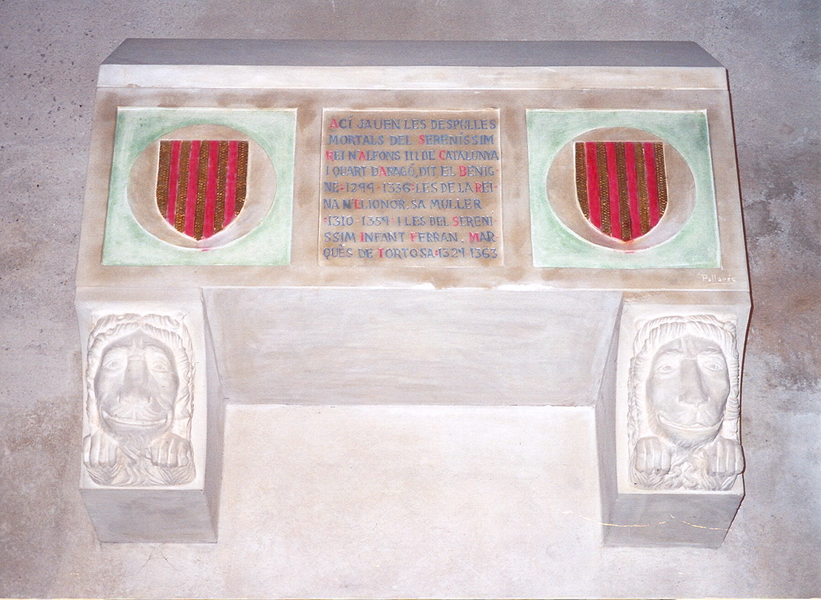
Alleged sepulcher of Queen Eleanor in the Old Cathedral of Lleida.

In the Old Cathedral of Lleida is a tomb in which on 23 October 1986 the remains of Alfonso IV of Aragon were deposited. Next to him, were also deposited the remains of a young man, identified as the Infante Ferdinand, son of Alfonso IV, and those of an adult woman, who were identified as those of Queen Eleanor, second wife of King Alfonso IV. The remains of Alfonso IV, who had been transferred to the Old Cathedral of Lleida in 1781, remained in the crypt until 1986, when they were placed in a stone tomb, located next to the door of San Berenguer of the cathedral.

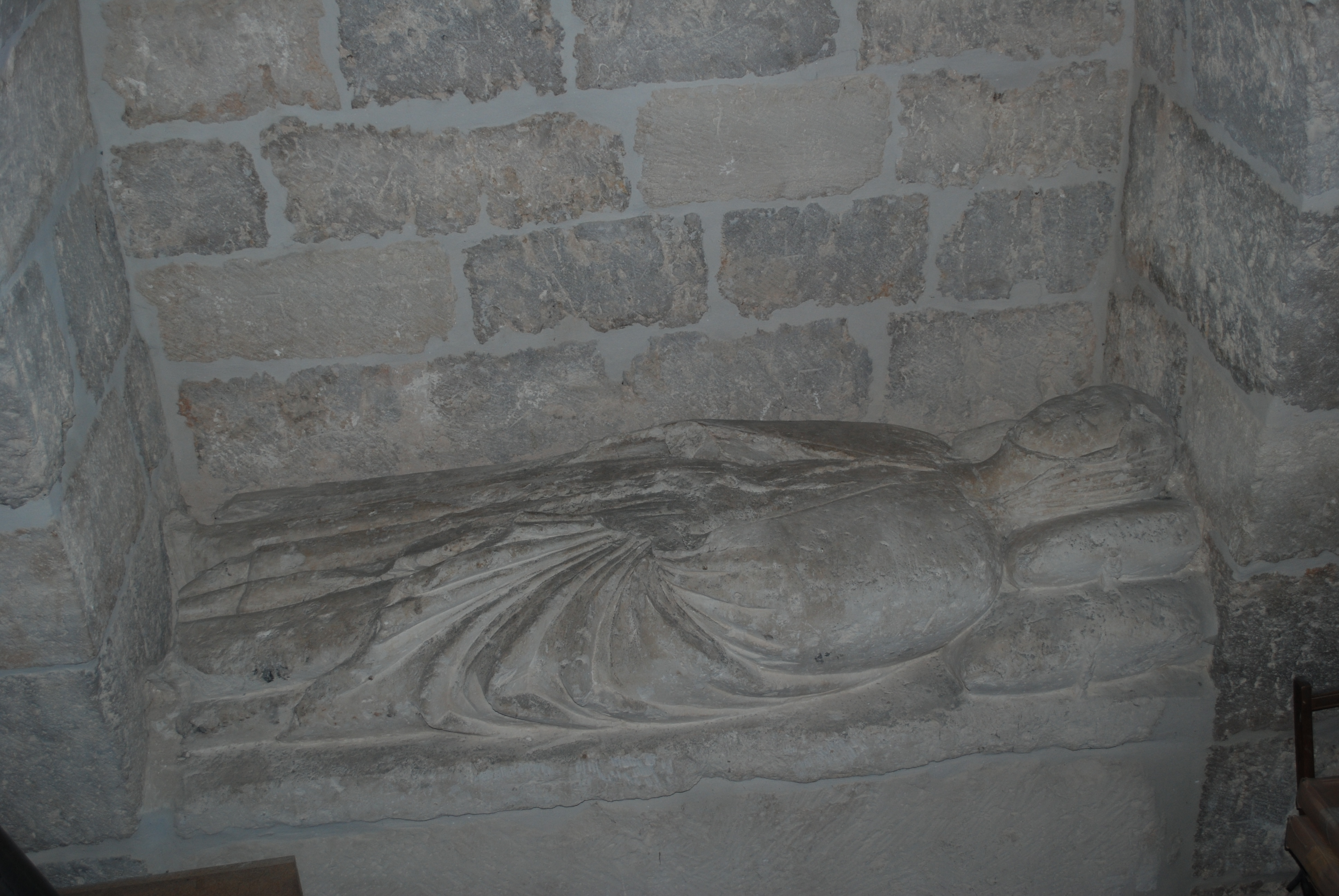
Alleged sepulcher of Queen Eleanor of Castile in the Church of Nuestra Señora del Manzano of Castrojeriz.

In the Church of Nuestra Señora del Manzano of Castrojeriz a tomb is conserved, attributed to the Queen Eleanor de Castile, that is located at the feet of the church, near the baptistery, and was discovered in June 1970, hidden behind a wall of adobe, by the Rescue Mission Group Marqués de Camarasa School Group. From the moment of his discovery, the grave was attributed by the experts to Eleanor, daughter of Ferdinand IV, because the fashion of the sepulcher corresponds with other tombs realized in the middle of the 14th century, as well as by the fact that on its cap appears the sculpted figure of a woman. The assumption that Queen Eleanor was buried in this tomb is supported by certain documents.

== Notes ==
Eleanor of Castile (1307–1359) Castilian House of Ivrea Cadet branch of the Anscarids Born: circa 1307 Died: circa 1359
Royal titles
Vacant Title last held by Elisenda of Montcada	Queen consort of Aragon; Valencia and Sardinia; 1329–1336	Vacant Title next held by Maria of Navarre
