= List of Valencian monarchs =

Coat of arms of Aragonese Monarchs, also used as royal emblem in Valencia

Former coat of arms of Valencia (before 18th century)

For the majority of the Middle Ages, Valencia was a constituent part of larger polities. From the time of the Muslim conquest of the Iberian Peninsula, Valencia was controlled by the Umayyad Caliphate in Damascus and the Emirate/Caliphate of Cordoba. Following the latter's collapse, Valencia became the seat of a Taifa state ruled by a succession of local dynasties from 1010 until it was conquered by Rodrigo Díaz de Vivar, El Cid, in 1095. He ruled until his death, when his widow swore fealty to Castile, but was forced out in 1102 and Valencia fell back under the control of a Muslim Caliphate.

Again in the 1140s, Caliphate collapse led to the return of local rule, but following four changes of leadership in two years it fell under the control of neighboring Murcia, and later the Almohad Caliphate. A third time, in 1229, Valencia saw almost a decade of local rule before being conquered by Aragon in 1237. Valencia was reorganized into an administrative 'Kingdom of Valencia' within the Crown of Aragon, ruled by Governors appointed by the Aragonese monarch. This arrangement continued until the formal creation of the Crown of Spain and abolition of the previous administrative kingdoms by the Nueva Planta Decrees in 1714.

== Rulers of Valencia (713-1239) ==
For those who ruled in or over Valencia, see the following pages:

- 713–1010 : Umayyad Caliphate and Emirate/Caliphate of Córdoba
- 1010–1095 : First Taifa of Valencia
- 1095–1099 : El Cid
- 1099–1102 : Castile
- 1102–1145 : Almoravids of Morocco
- 1145–1147 : Second Taifa of Valencia
- 1147–1172 : Taifa of Murcia
- 1172–1229 : Almohad Caliphate
- 1229–1239 : Third Taifa of Valencia

== Monarchs of Valencia (1239-1707) ==
=== House of Aragon ===
- 1238-1276 : James I the Conqueror, King of Aragon and Count of Barcelona
- 1276-1285 : Peter I the Great (III of Aragon), son of James I
- 1285-1291 : Alfons I the Liberal (III of Aragon), son of Peter I/III
- 1291-1327 : James II the Just, son of Peter I/III
- 1327-1336 : Alfons II the Kind (IV of Aragon), son of James II
- 1336-1387 : Peter II the Ceremonious (IV of Aragon), son of Alfonso II/IV
- 1387-1396 : John I the Hunter, son of Peter II/IV
- 1396-1410 : Martin the Elder, the Humane or the Ecclesiastic, son of Peter II/IV

Martin died without legitimate children.

=== Interregnum ===
- 1410-1412 : between the death of Martin the Elder and the Compromise of Caspe.

=== House of Trastámara ===
- 1412-1416 : Ferdinand I of Antequera or the Just, Martin's nephew
- 1416-1458 : Alfonso III the Magnanimous (V of Aragon), son of Ferdinand I
- 1458-1479 : John II the Great, son of Ferdinand I
- 1479-1516 : Ferdinand II the Catholic, son of John II

Ferdinand II became Jure uxoris King of Castile, jointly with his wife Isabella I. Dynastic union of Aragon with Castile.

- 1516-1555 : Joanna the Mad, daughter of Ferdinand II

Nominally jointly with her son Charles I but was effectively kept under confinement.

=== House of Habsburg ===
- 1516-1556 : Charles I the Emperor, grandson of Ferdinand II

Jointly with his mother Joanna the Mad (confined)

- 1556-1598 : Philip I the Prudent (Philip II of Castile), son of Charles I
- 1598-1621 : Philip II the Pious (Philip III of Castile), son of Philip I/II
- 1621-1665 : Philip III the Great (Philip IV of Castile), son of Philip II/III
- 1665-1700 : Charles II the Bewitched, son of Philip III/IV

Charles died without children.

=== War of the Spanish Succession ===
==== House of Bourbon ====
- 1700-1704 : Philip IV the Spirited (Philip V of Castile), great-grandson of Philip III/IV

==== House of Habsburg ====
- 1704-1707 : Charles III the Archduke, great-grandson of Philip II/III

During the war (officially in 1707) Philip d'Anjou, the first of the Bourbon empire in Spain, disbanded the Crown of Aragon (Nueva Planta decrees). After this time, there are no more Aragonese monarchs. Nevertheless, Spanish monarchs up to Isabella II, while styling themselves king/queen of Spain on coins, still used some of the traditional nomenclature of the defunct Crown of Aragon in their official documents: King/Queen of Castile, Leon, Aragon, both Sicilies, Jerusalem, Navarra, Granada, Toledo, Valencia, Galicia, Majorca, Sevilla, Sardinia, Cordova, Corsica, Murcia, Jaen, the Algarve, Algeciras, Gibraltar, the Canary Islands, the Eastern & Western Indias, the Islands & Mainland of the Ocean sea; Archduke of Austria; Duke of Burgundy, Brabant, Milan; Count of Habsburg, Flanders, Tyrol, Barcelona; Lord of Biscay, Molina.

== See also ==
- List of Spanish monarchs
- Kings of Spain family tree
