= Maria of Portugal, Marchioness of Tortosa =

Maria
- Marchioness of Tortosa
- Born: 6 April 1342; Évora, Kingdom of Portugal
- Died: 1377 (aged 34–35); Genoa, Republic of Genoa, Italy
- Burial: Monastery of Santa Clara-a-Velha, Portugal
- Spouse: Infante Ferdinand of Aragon, Marquis of Tortosa
- House: Portuguese House of Burgundy
- Father: Peter I of Portugal
- Mother: Constance Manuel

Maria of Portugal (Portuguese pronunciation: [mɐˈɾiɐ]; 6 April 1342, in Évora, Kingdom of Portugal – 1377, in Genoa, Republic of Genoa, Italy) was a Portuguese infanta (princess) member of the House of Burgundy and by marriage marchioness of Tortosa and lady of Albarracín.

She was the eldest child and daughter of King Peter I of Portugal and his wife Constance Manuel. Her parents' marriage produced four children, but only infanta Maria and her younger brother, the future King Ferdinand I of Portugal, survived adulthood; from her father's relationship (or second marriage) with Inês de Castro and later affair with Teresa Lourenço, she had several half-siblings, including Beatrice, countess of Alburquerque, and John of Aviz, who became king of Portugal in 1385 and founder of the House of Aviz, who ruled the Kingdom of Portugal until 1580.

== Life ==
On 3 February 1354, the 11-years-old infanta Maria married her distant cousin infante Fernando of Aragon, Marquis of Tortosa and Lord of Albarracín (son of King Alfonso IV of Aragon and his second wife, Eleanor of Castile). This marriage was arranged by her grandfather, King Afonso IV of Portugal. About this union, from which there was no offspring, historian Jerónimo Zurita y Castro mentions that "the King of Aragon (Pedro IV) showed much discontent and regret", since it meant that from that moment the Kingdom of Portugal took part in the conflict between Aragon and Castile. King Afonso IV gave to his granddaughter as a dowry the villages of Ilhavo, Milho, Arcos, Crastadaes, Quintella, Carvalhaes, Ferreiros, and houses in Espinel, Cea, Ponte de Almeara and Avellãas.

During the War of the two Pedros between King Pedro IV of Aragon and his cousin King Pedro I of Castile (nicknamed the Cruel), infante Fernando, who aspired to the throne of the latter, turned out to be a completely annoying ally for his half-brother Pedro IV, who, remembering his previous participation in the revolt of the Kingdom of Valencia, had him assassinated on 16 July 1363.

The now widowed infanta Maria sees how her brother-in-law seized her deceased husband's domains (Tortosa, Albarracín, Fraga and other places) and forbade her to return to Portugal, as was her intention, until she renounced all the property that belonged to her husband. After an unsuccessful attempt to escape, she was arrested and taken to court, remaining in the custody of two Aragonese ladies of her sister-in-law Queen Eleanor of Sicily, despite the protests of King Charles II of Navarre, who supported her.

The following nine years (1364–1373), infanta Maria's life must not have been easy in Barcelona. Surrounded by relatives of her husband who hated her to the point of wanting to kill her, and suspected her enough to believe that she could use magic and spells against her enemies (Juan, Duke of Girona even accused her of being the instigator of the death of his intended wife, princess Joanna of France, with the help of the midwife Bonanada (Note: In a letter from 1374, the Duke of Girona reproaches his father King Pedro IV: "Bonana [...] who had cast spells or sorcery on the Princess de France, our betrothed, may God have, by induction of the Infanta de Portugal".)), Maria remained deprived of freedom of movement.

During her stay in the Aragonese court, she received through Pope Urban V a proposal of marriage of King Frederick III of Sicily, which she rejected.

On 9 October 1365, infanta Maria dictated her first testament, and on 6 December 1370 a second one modified, in the Monastery of Poblet, the contents of the previous testament. Although she generally maintained the provisions set forth in the first will, there are a number of changes, especially related to the death of some legatees. In her will, infanta Maria appoints as executors her brother, King Fernando I of Portugal, and Martinho Gil de Basto, Bishop of Évora, for all matters related to Portugal. In addition, she also appointed Queen Eleanor of Sicily as executor (so that she could ensure the correct execution of the will concerning the Aragonese legacies) along with Romeu Sescomes, Bishop of Lleida, her butler Gil Roderic de Almazán, her aia Constança d'Arana, Guillem de Comes, provost of Tarragona, her treasurer Joan Sanç de Molina, and Berenguer de Santjust. About the executors for the Aragonese legacies, the infanta probably chose those whom she believed neutral or faithful to her in the conflict she faced with King Pedro IV.

However, despite the mistreatment she suffered with her in-laws, in the context of the First Fernandine War, infanta Maria made an effort to establish an alliance between the Kingdoms of Aragon and Portugal:

"From Valencia this winter were sent by ambassadors to King Fernando de Portugal, don Juan de Vilaragut and a lawyer who called himself Bernaldo de Miragle; and they took commission to treat of marriage of infante don Juan duke of Girona with infanta doña Beatriz sister of the King of Portugal, who had already waged war against the King of Castile by entering powerfully by Galicia, pretending that the succession of those kingdoms belonged to him because he was the great-grandson of King don Sancho and grandson of Queen doña Beatriz his daughter who married King don Afonso of Portugal his grandfather. Made a great effort for this peace and new confederation to be settled between the King of Aragon and the King of Portugal infanta doña Maria sister of the King of Portugal wife of infante don Fernando marquis of Tortosa who was in these kingdoms".

According to Zurita, under the terms of the treaty between the two kingdoms, would remain as hostages (guarantors) João Afonso Telo, 4th Count of Barcelos, Martim Garcia and Badasal Spinola "crossbowmen of the King of Portugal".

In the Kingdom of Aragon, infanta Maria met the aforementioned Badasal Spinola, Genoese who served under her brother, King Fernando I. Fernão Lopes, in his Crónica de el-rei D. Fernando (chapter LIV), wrote about what happened next:

"Micer Badasal did not return to the kingdom (of Portugal), and the long affection that he had with the Infanta, making him always bearer of similar fruits, made her sell as much income as she had in Aragon and went with him to Genoa, and then he left her and she lived meagerly, dying far removed from what her honor belonged to".

Finally, in Barcelona on 27 May 1373, infanta Maria and King Pedro IV reached an agreement and, on 13 August of that year, she dispensed several mayors from the bond of homage and vassalage to her.

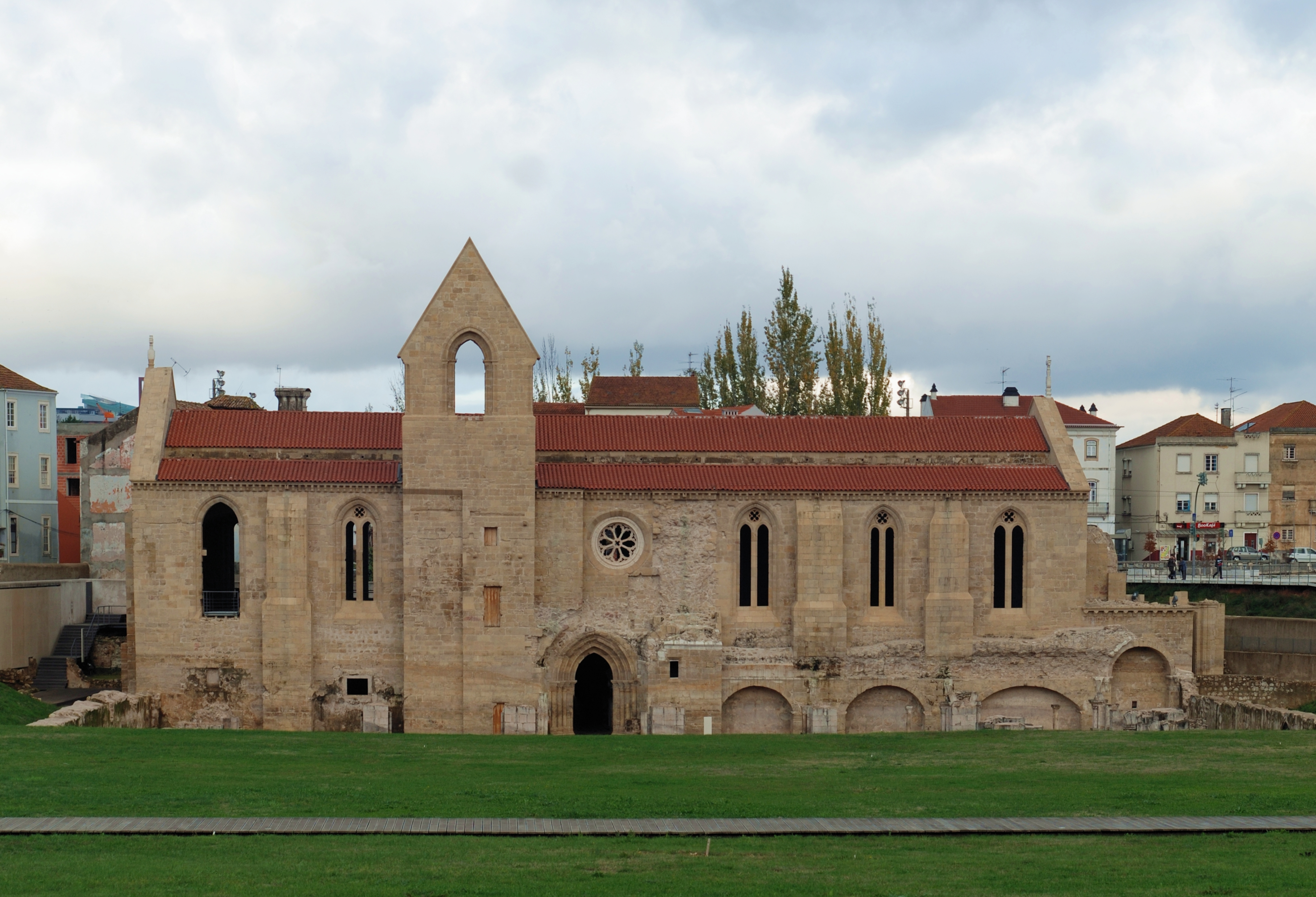
Monastery of Santa Clara-a-Velha where Maria was possibly buried.

From Fernão Lopes' writings about her, she certainly was alive after 1374, a fact confirmed not only by the infanta's pact with King Pedro IV but also by the letter that the Duke of Girona wrote to his father in that year, in which she is mentioned. Historian Ana Rodrigues Oliveira mentioned that she returned to Portugal after 1375 and was buried in the Monastery of Santa Clara-a-Velha in Coimbra; however, in a letter from 8 May 1377, King Pedro IV informed his eldest son that "Cert ardit havem haüt que la infanta de Portugal és morta en Jènova" (We have heard that the Infanta of Portugal died in Genoa) and indicates to him that it is convenient to show mourning.

== Bibliography ==
- Caetano de Souza, Antonio (1735). Historia Genealógica de la Real Casa Portuguesa (PDF) (in Portuguese). Vol. I. Lisbon: Lisboa Occidental, na oficina de Joseph Antonio da Sylva. ISBN 978-84-8109-908-9.
- Lopes, Fernão (1735). Joze Pereira Bayam (ed.). Chronica del Rey D. Pedro I (in Portuguese). Lisbon: Lisboa Occidental. OCLC 560418350.
- Pretel Martín, Aurelio; Rodríguez Llopis, Miguel (1998). El señorío de Villena en el siglo XIV (PDF) (in Spanish) (1° ed.). Albacete: Instituto de Estudios Albacetenses. ISBN 978-84-87136-86-3.
- Ramón Pont, Antonio (1983). "El infante don Fernando, señor de Orihuela en la guerra de los dos Pedros (1356-1363)" (PDF). Anales de la Universidad de Alicante. Historia medieval (in Spanish) (2). Alicante: Universitat d´Alacant / Universidad de Alicante: Servicio de Publicaciones: 63–92. doi:10.14198/medieval.1983.2.05.
- Rodrigues Oliveira, Ana (2010). Rainhas medievais de Portugal. Dezassete mulheres, duas dinastias, quatro séculos de História (in Portuguese). Lisbon: A esfera dos livros. ISBN 978-989-626-261-7.
