= James of Aragon (monk) =

Eldest child of King James II of Aragon

James of Aragon (29 September 1296 – July 1334) was the eldest child of King James II. His mother was Blanche of Naples, the second of his father's four wives. As the king's eldest son, James was not only an infante but also heir apparent to the Crown of Aragon, a realm stretching from north-eastern Spain to Sardinia and Corsica. He is best known for his unexpected decision to renounce his marriage and right to the throne and become a monk.

== Youth ==
When Queen Blanche's pregnancy became apparent in the spring of 1296, King James II sent for a respected physician from Paris, who helped the queen deliver Infante James on 29 September. King James personally oversaw the health of the heir apparent to the Crown of Aragon, even after the infante reached adulthood; he appointed his son's physicians and expected them to regularly report to him. Even the infante's chamberlain was a former royal surgeon. James was appointed procurator general already in his youth, with the task of handling judicial affairs in the name of his father. In 1313, he survived a severe fever.

== Marriage controversy ==
James's engagement to Eleanor of Castile was agreed upon in December 1308 at Monreal de Ariza. The union was of great importance, as the one-year-old infanta was the only child of King Ferdinand IV. Eleanor moved to Aragon in 1312, to be raised as its future queen. James, however, was notoriously unpredictable. In the spring of 1318, aged 22, he announced to his father that he wished to break off the engagement and renounce his right to the crown so that he could take holy orders, despite never before having shown interest in monastic life. The infuriated king tried unsuccessfully to dissuade him. In August, the infante came down with an abscess, from which he suffered throughout the autumn and into the winter. He used it as an excuse not to visit his father, which further worsened their relationship. The marriage went ahead despite the bridegroom's vehement opposition. It was celebrated on 5 October 1319 in Gandesa, but James refused to consummate it. At the time of the wedding, the bride was only 12 years old, while James was 23.

== Cloistered life ==
The king eventually gave in to his son's demands. The renunciation was ratified in the presence of an assembly of noblemen at the Monastery of Saint Francis in Tarragona on 22 December. The marriage, unconsummated, was easily annulled. James entered the Order of Saint John of Jerusalem, only to leave it later to join the local Order of Montesa. Father and son's relationship became increasingly strained following the renunciation, with the younger James's instability and licentiousness continuously troubling the king.

On the death of their father in 1327, the crown passed to James's brother, the freshly widowed Alfonso IV. Alfonso proceeded to marry Eleanor, James's former wife, in 1329. James died in July 1334.
