= John of Aragon (patriarch) =

Aragonese Roman Catholic archbishop (1304–1334)

John
- Archbishop of Toledo & Tarragona
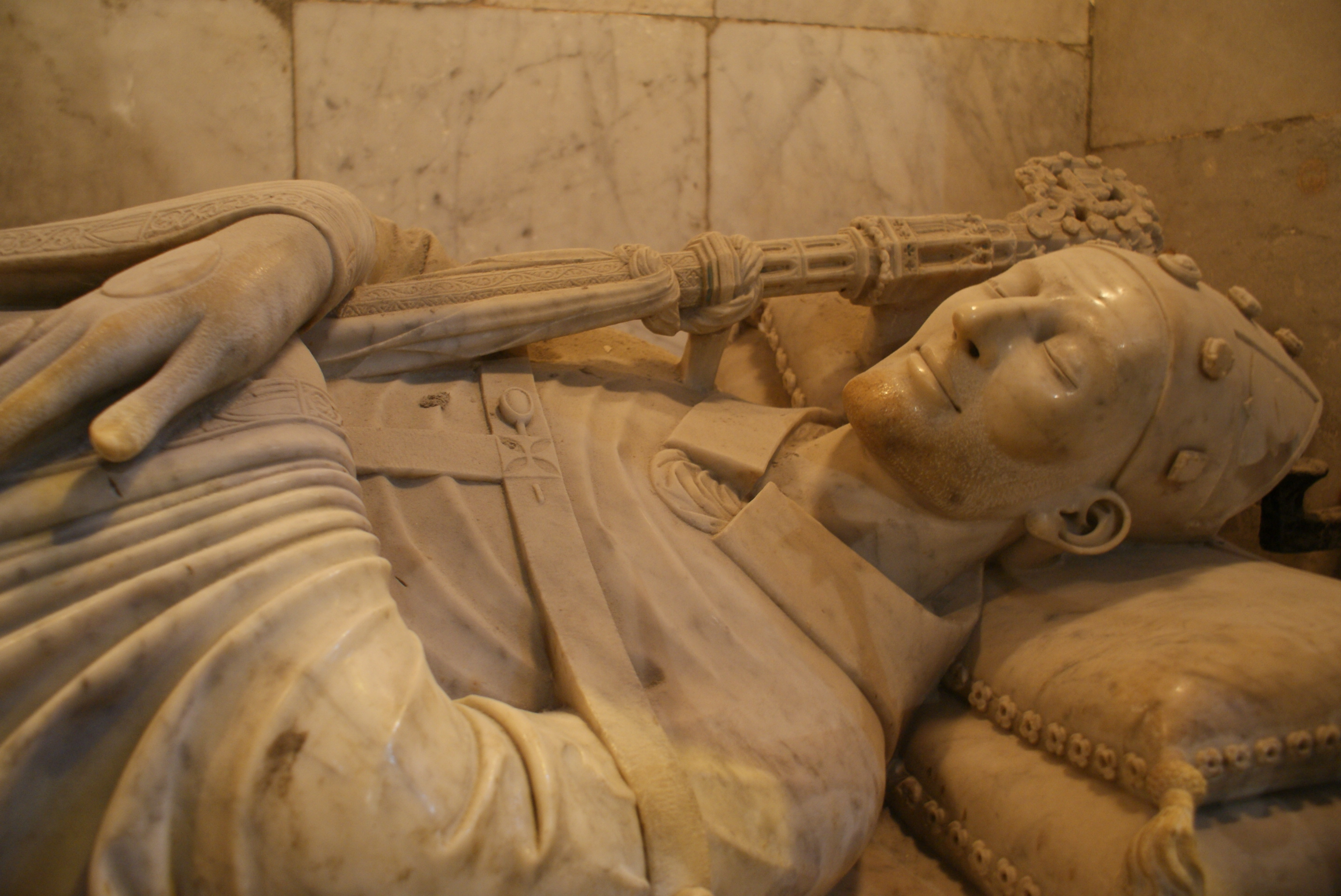
- John's tomb in Tarragona Cathedral.

Latin patriarch of Alexandria
- Reign: 27 August 1328 - 19 August 1334
- Predecessor: Oddone Sala
- Successor: Guillaume de Chanac
- Born: 1304
- Died: 19 August 1334 (aged 29–30); Podo, Saragossa
- Noble family: House of Barcelona
- Father: James II of Aragon
- Mother: Blanche of Anjou

John of Aragon (1304–1334, Pobo, Saragossa) was a prince of Aragon. He was the son of James II of Aragon and his second wife Blanche of Anjou. He was archbishop of Toledo from 1319 until 1328. He became archbishop of Tarragona in 1327 and Latin Patriarch of Alexandria in 1328, holding both posts until his death.

With his generous donation the Carthusian monastery of Scala Dei in southern Catalonia could double its seize and build a second cloister with twelve cells in 1333.
