= James II of Aragon =

Ruler of Aragon, Valencia, Barcelona and Sicily (1267-1327)

James II
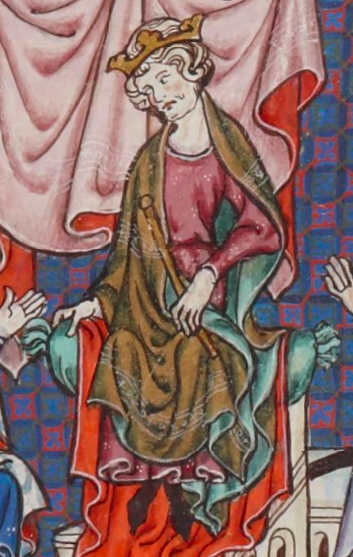
- James, from a manuscript (BNF, Latin 4670 A) of the Constitutions of Catalonia

King of Sicily
- Reign: 2 November 1285 – 20 June 1295
- Predecessor: Constance II and Peter I
- Successor: Frederick III

King of Aragon and Valencia Count of Barcelona
- Reign: 18 June 1291 – 2 or 5 November 1327
- Predecessor: Alfonso III
- Successor: Alfonso IV

King of Sardinia and Corsica
- Reign: 4 April 1297 – 2 or 5 November 1327
- Successor: Alfonso IV
- Born: 10 April 1267; Valencia, Kingdom of Valencia, Crown of Aragon
- Died: 2/5 November 1327 (aged 60); Barcelona, Principality of Catalonia, Crown of Aragon
- Burial: Santes Creus
- Spouses: Isabella of Castile (m. 1291; ann. 1295) Blanche of Anjou (m. 1295; died 1310) Marie of Lusignan (m. 1315; died 1319) Elisenda of Montcada (m. 1322)
- Issue among others...: James; Alfonso IV, King of Aragon; Maria, Lady of Cameros; Constance, Princess of Villena; John; Isabella, Queen of Germany; Peter IV, Count of Ribagorza
- House: House of Barcelona
- Father: Peter III of Aragon
- Mother: Constance II of Sicily

James II (Catalan: Jaume II; Aragonese: Chaime II; Spanish: Jaime II; 10 April 1267 or c. 1264 – 2 or 5 or 3 November 1327), called the Just, (Note: Catalan: Jaume el Just, Aragonese: Chaime lo Chusto.) was King of Aragon and Valencia and Count of Barcelona from 1291 to 1327. He was also King of Sicily (as James I) (Note: Italian: Giacomo I il Giusto.) from 1285 to 1295 and King of Majorca from 1291 to 1295. From 1297, he was nominally King of Sardinia and Corsica, but he only acquired the island of Sardinia by conquest in 1324. His full title for the last three decades of his reign was "James, by the grace of God, king of Aragon, Valencia, Sardinia and Corsica, and count of Barcelona" (Middle Latin: Iacobus Dei gratia rex Aragonum, Valencie, Sardinie, et Corsice ac comes Barchinone).

Born at Valencia, James was the second son of Peter III of Aragon and Constance II of Sicily. He succeeded his father in Sicily in 1285 and his elder brother Alfonso III in Aragon and the rest of the Spanish territories, including Majorca, in 1291. In 1295, he was forced to cede Sicily to the papacy, after which it was seized by his younger brother, Frederick III, in 1296. Two years later, rom Pope Boniface VIII returned the island to the king of Majorca along with rights to Sardinia and Corsica. On 20 January 1296, Boniface issued the bull Redemptor mundi granting James the titles of Standard-bearer, Captain General and Admiral of the Roman church.

== Reign ==
=== 1285–1298 ===
James succeeded his father as king of Sicily in 1286, being crowned in Palermo. In response, Pope Honorius IV excommunicated James. Upon the death of his brother Alfonso III in 1291, he succeeded also to the throne of the Crown of Aragon. He spent May of that year in Catania, inspiring the local monk Atanasiu di Iaci to write the Vinuta di re Iapicu about his time there. By a peace treaty with King Charles II of Naples in 1296, he agreed to give up Sicily, but the Sicilians instead installed his brother Frederick on the throne.

Due to the fact that Frederick would not withdraw from the island, Pope Boniface VIII asked James II, along with Charles II of Naples, to remove him. As an enticement to do this the Pope invested James II with the title to Sardinia and Corsica, as well as appointing him papal gonfalonier. Because of his inability to disguise his apathy on the matter, he returned to Aragon. Frederick reigned there until his death in 1337.

By the Treaty of Anagni in 1295, he returned the Balearic Islands to his uncle James II of Majorca. In 1298, by the Treaty of Argilers, James of Majorca recognised the suzerainty of James of Aragon.

=== 1298–1327 ===
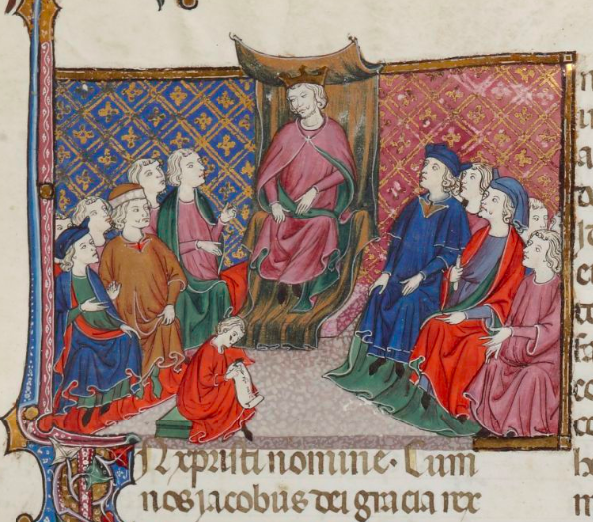
James presiding over a parliament at Lleida in 1301. Note the words at the bottom: nos jacobus dei gracia rex (we, James, by the grace of God, king).

During the period that followed his return to Aragon, James II wanted to gain access to the Muslim world in the south, from which Castile restricted Aragon. In order to achieve this goal, and assisted by his Admiral Don Bernat de Sarrià, Baron of Polop, he formed an alliance with the enemies of the adolescent king of Castile, Ferdinand IV. James II wanted Murcia in order to give his kingdom access to Granada. The allied forces entered from all directions in 1296, where James II was victorious in capturing Murcia and holding it until 1304.

In 1313, James II granted administrative and political autonomy to the Aran Valley, the legal details of which are described in a Latin manuscript called the Querimonia. The devolution of power was a reward for the Aranese pledging allegiance to James II in a dispute with the kingdoms of France and Majorca over control of the valley.

James was involved in the 1321 leper scare. He ordered the arrest and torture of French lepers seeking shelter in his realm, and adopted harsher policy towards native lepers.

== Writing ==
It was probably during his reign at Sicily (1285–1291) that James composed his only surviving piece of Occitan poetry, a religious dansa dedicated to the Virgin Mary, Mayre de Deu. (Note: A short analysis, with useful footnotes, and eight lines quoted with Catalan translation.) A contemporary, Arnau de Vilanova, wrote a verse-by-verse Latin commentary of the dansa in 1305. The metaphor James uses has been analysed by Alfred Jeanroy, who sees similarities in the Roman de Fauvel.

James begins by comparing the Church to a ship in a storm, poorly guided by its pilot (nauchier, i.e. the Pope):

Mayre de Deu e fylha,
verge humil e vera,
vostra nau vos apela
que l'aydetz, quar perylha.

Translation:

Mother of God and daughter,
virgin humble and true,
your ship appeals [cries out] to you
that you help it, because it is imperiled.

The literary quality of the verses is neither astounding nor disappointing, but the song was clearly written at a moment when James was in conflict with the Papacy, perhaps with a propagandistic end, to prove his piety and fidelity to the Church if not the Papacy. The final verses ask Mary to protect him, the king, from sin:

Mayre, tu·m dona forsa
contra ma leugeria,
e·m garda de la via
de peccat, que.ns exylha.

Translation:

Mother, grant me power
against my weakness,
and guard me from the way
of sin, that destroys.

== Family ==
=== Marriages, concubines and children ===
James married four times:

— Isabella of Castile, Viscountess of Limoges, daughter of Sancho IV of Castile and his wife María de Molina. The wedding took place in the city of Soria, on 1 December 1291 when the bride was only 8 years old. The marriage, which was never consummated, was dissolved and annulled after Pope Boniface VIII refused to granted a dispensation for the marriage.

— Blanche of Anjou, daughter of his family's rival Charles II of Naples and Maria of Hungary. They married in the city of Villabertran, on 29 October or 1 November 1295. They had several children:

- James (b. 29 September 1296 – d. Tarragona, July 1334). James renounced his right to the throne in 1319 to become a monk. He refused to consummate his marriage to Eleanor of Castile, who later become the second wife of his brother Alfonso.
- Alfonso IV of Aragon (1299 – 24 January 1336). He became the King of Aragon in 1327 and ruled until his death. He married twice: first Teresa d'Entença and then Eleanor of Castile after his first wife died.
- Maria (b. 1299 – d. as a nun in Sijena, 1347), wife of Peter, son of Sancho IV of Castile.
- Constance (b. Valencia, 1 April 1300 – d. Castillo de Garcia Munoz, 19 September 1327), wife of Juan Manuel, Prince of Villena, nephew of Alfonso X of Castile.
- John (b. 1304 – d. Pobo, Zaragoza, 19 August 1334). John became the first Archbishop of Toledo and Tarragona in 1318, and Patriarch of Alexandria in 1328.
- Isabella of Aragon (b. 1305 – d. Styria, 12 July 1330), wife of Frederick I of Austria.
- Peter (b. 1305 – d. Pisa, 4 November 1381), Count of Ribagorza, Empúries and Prades. Peter married Joan, daughter of Gaston I of Foix.
- Blanche (b. 1307 – d. Barcelona, 1348), Prioress of Sixena.
- Ramon Berenguer (b. August 1308 – d. a priest at Barcelona, 1366), Count of Empúries and Baron of Ejerica. Ramon married Blanche, daughter of Philip I of Taranto, and then Maria, daughter of James of Aragon. His daughter Joan married Fernando Manuel, son of Juan Manuel, Prince of Villena
- Violante (b. Barcelona, October 1310 – d. Pedrola, 19 July 1353). She first married Philip, Despot of Romania, son of Philip I of Taranto. Her second marriage was to Lope de Luna, Lord of Segorbe.

— Marie of Lusignan (1273 – April 1319 at Tortosa, buried at Barcelona), daughter of the King Hugh III of Cyprus. They married by proxy in Santa Sophia, Nicosia, on 15 June 1315, and in person in the city of Girona, on 27 November 1315. This marriage was childless.

— Elisenda de Montcada, daughter of Pedro I de Montcada, Lord of Altona and Soses, and wife Gisela d'Abarca. They married in the city of Tarragona, on 25 December 1322. This marriage was childless, too, and, after the king's death, she entered the Poor Clares Monastery of Pedralbes as a nun, where she died on 19 June 1364.

In addition to his legitimate offspring, James had three natural children born with Sicilian women:

— With Gerolda:

- Sancho (b. Sicily, 1287 – d. young?).
- Napoleón (b. Sicily, 1288 – m. 1338), Lord of Joyosa Guarda (Gioiosaguardia) and Acquafredda (in Sardinia); married a daughter of a Majorcan named Guillermo Robert.

— With Lucrecia:

- James (b. Mazzara, 1291 – d. 1350), Vicario di Cagliari (1317–1341); married firstly with Jaumetta Guerau, from Majorca, and secondly with Puccia, a Sardinian woman.

== Effigy ==
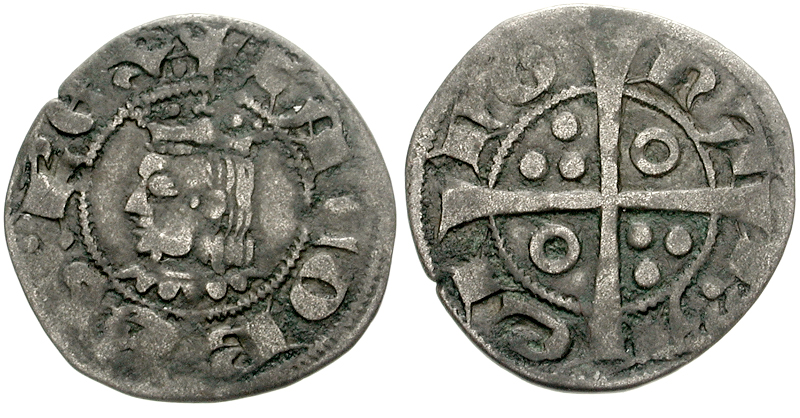
A diner minted at Barcelona with James II's left-facing bust on the obverse

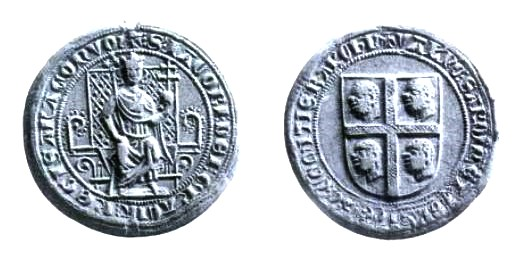
Lead seal showing James II seated on a throne and holding an orb, with the Sardinian coat-of-arms on the reverse

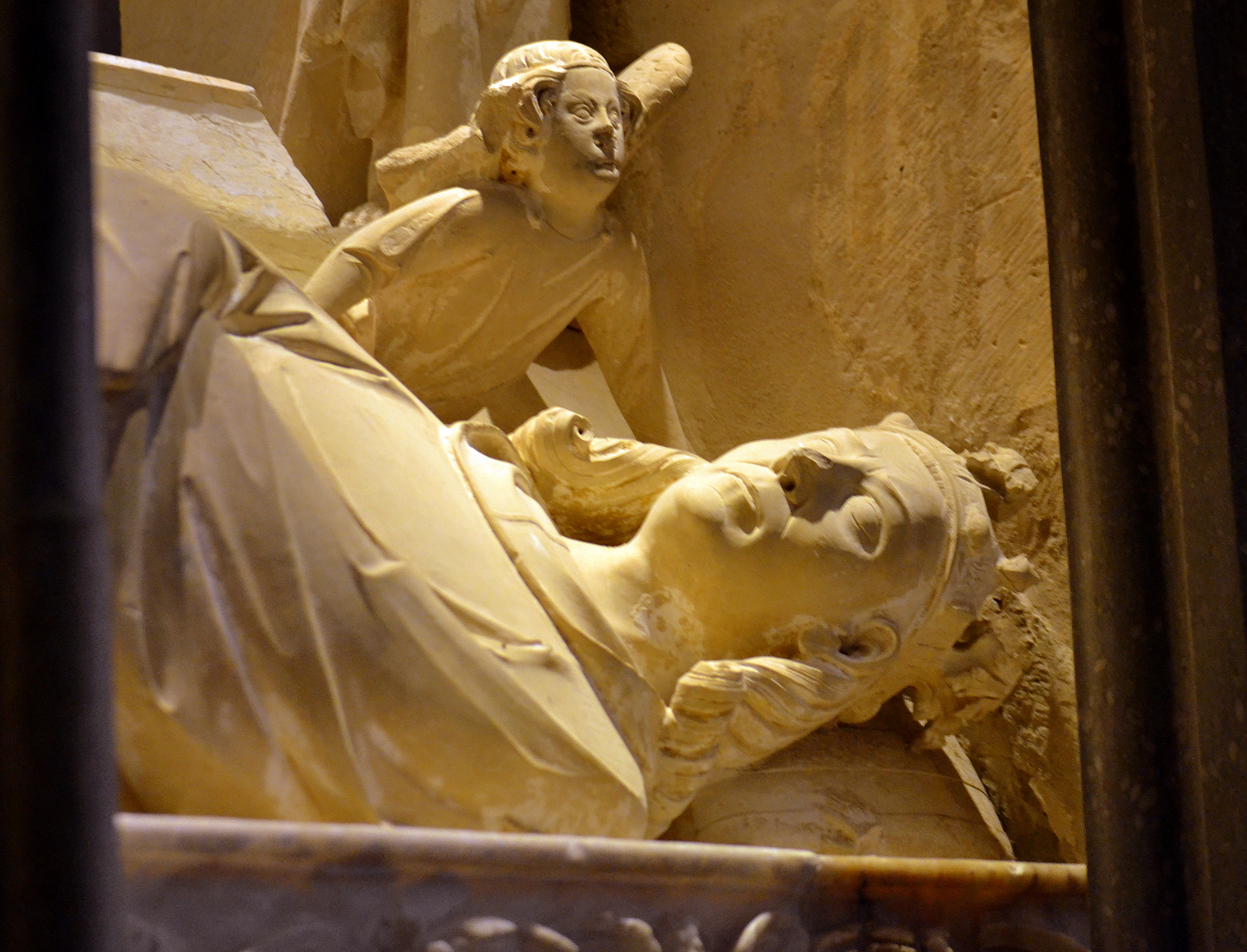
Tomb effigy of James in the royal monastery of Santes Creus

== Sources ==
- Burgtorf, Jochen (2008). The Central Convent of Hospitallers and Templars: History, Organization, and Personnel (1099/1120-1310). Leiden: Brill. ISBN 978-90-04-16660-8.632
- Constable, Olivia Remie; Zurro, Damian, eds. (1997). Medieval Iberia: Readings from Christian, Muslim, and Jewish Sources. University of Pennsylvania Press. ISBN 978-0-8122-2168-8.
- d'Avray, David (2015). Papacy, Monarchy and Marriage 860–1600. Cambridge: Cambridge University Press. ISBN 978-1-107-06253-5.
- Del Estal, Juan Manuel (2009). Itinerario de Jaime II de Aragón (1291-1327) (in Spanish). Zaragoza: Institución Fernando el Católico. ISBN 978-84-7820-984-2.
- Hillgarth, J. N. (1972). "Review of The Rise of the Aragonese-Catalan Empire, 1200–1350 by J. Lee Shneidman". Speculum. 47 (2 Apr). doi:10.2307/2856725. JSTOR 2856725.
- Hinojosa Montalvo, José (2006). Jaime II y el esplendor de la Corona de Aragón (in Spanish). Sebastián: Nerea. ISBN 978-84-89569-99-7.
- Hohenstaufen, Frederick II (1961). The Art of Falconry. Translated by Wood, Casey A.; Fyfe, F. Marjorie. Stanford University Press.
- Lodge, Eleanor Constance (1924). The End of the Middle Age, 1273-1453. Methuen & Company Limited.
- Scarlata, Maria (1993). Carte reali diplomatiche di Giacomo II d'Aragona (1291-1327) riguardanti l'Italia. Documenti per servire alla storia di Sicilia (in Latin, Italian, and Spanish). Vol. 31. Palermo: Società siciliana per la storia patria. OCLC 41922651.
- Turell, M. Teresa, ed. (2001). Multilingualism in Spain : Sociolinguistic and Psycholinguistic aspects of linguistic minority groups ([Online-Ausg.] ed.). Clevedon [u.a.]: Multilingual Matters. ISBN 9781853594915.
- de Riquer, Martín (1964). Història de la Literatura Catalana. Vol. 1. Edicions Ariel.
- Watt, J.A.; et al. (The New Cambridge Medieval History) (1999). "The papacy". In Abulafia, David; McKitterick, Rosamond (eds.). C.1198-c.1300. Vol. V. Cambridge University Press.

James II of Aragon House of Barcelona Born: 10 August 1267 Died: 2/5 November 1327
Regnal titles
New title	King of Sardinia and Corsica; 1297–1327	Succeeded by Alfonso IV
Preceded by Alfonso III	King of Aragon and Valencia; Count of Barcelona; 1291–1327	Succeeded by Alfonso IV
Preceded by Alfonso III	King of Majorca by conquest; still disputed with James II; 1291–1295	Succeeded by James II
Preceded by Peter I and Constance II	King of Sicily; 1285–1295	Succeeded by Frederick III
