= Philip, Despot of Romania =

Despot of Romania (d. 1331)

Philip (died June 1331) was the second eldest son of Prince Philip I of Taranto and Thamar Angelina Komnene. His older brother, Charles, died in 1315. On 19 April 1319, his father granted him the title of Despot of Romania, which actually corresponded to rule over a small part of Albania, but also to the Prince of Taranto's claim on the Despotate of Epirus to the south. In May 1321, Philip was engaged to Beatrice, daughter of Count Louis I of Clermont. She brought as her dowry the 40,000 livres tournois, which Louis had agreed to pay Duke Odo IV of Burgundy in exchange for Odo's claim to the Principality of Achaea. Instead, Prince Philip had arranged to purchase Odo's rights for the same amount and marry his son to Louis's daughter. The engagement with Beatrice was canceled by 1329, when Philip married Violante (Yolanda), daughter of King James II of Aragon. In 1328, Philip's father decided to send a fleet to conquer the Despotate of Epirus. The fleet finally embarked in 1329. The younger Philip got as far as Nafpaktos, but on the eve of launching the land expedition, he died. Philip predeceased his father. Violante, his widow, died in 1353.

== Sources ==
- Kiesewetter, Andreas (1997). "Filippo I d'Angiò, imperatore nominale di Costantinopoli". Dizionario Biografico degli Italiani (in Italian). Vol. 47: Ferrero–Filonardi. Rome: Istituto dell'Enciclopedia Italiana. ISBN 978-88-12-00032-6.
- Longnon, Jean (1949). L'empire latin de Constantinople et la principauté de Morée (in French). Paris: Payot.
- Mas Latrie, Louis de (1882). Les princes de Morée ou d'Achaïe, 1203–1461 (in French). Venice.
- Nicol, Donald MacGillivray (2010). The Despotate of Epiros 1267–1479: A Contribution to the History of Greece in the Middle Ages. Cambridge University Press. ISBN 978-0-521-13089-9.
- Topping, Peter (1975). "The Morea, 1311–1364". In Hazard, Harry W. (ed.). A History of the Crusades, Vol. III: The Fourteenth and Fifteenth Centuries. University of Wisconsin Press. pp. 104–140. ISBN 0-299-06670-3.
