= Alfonso IV of Aragon =

King of Aragon from 1327 to 1336

Alfonso IV
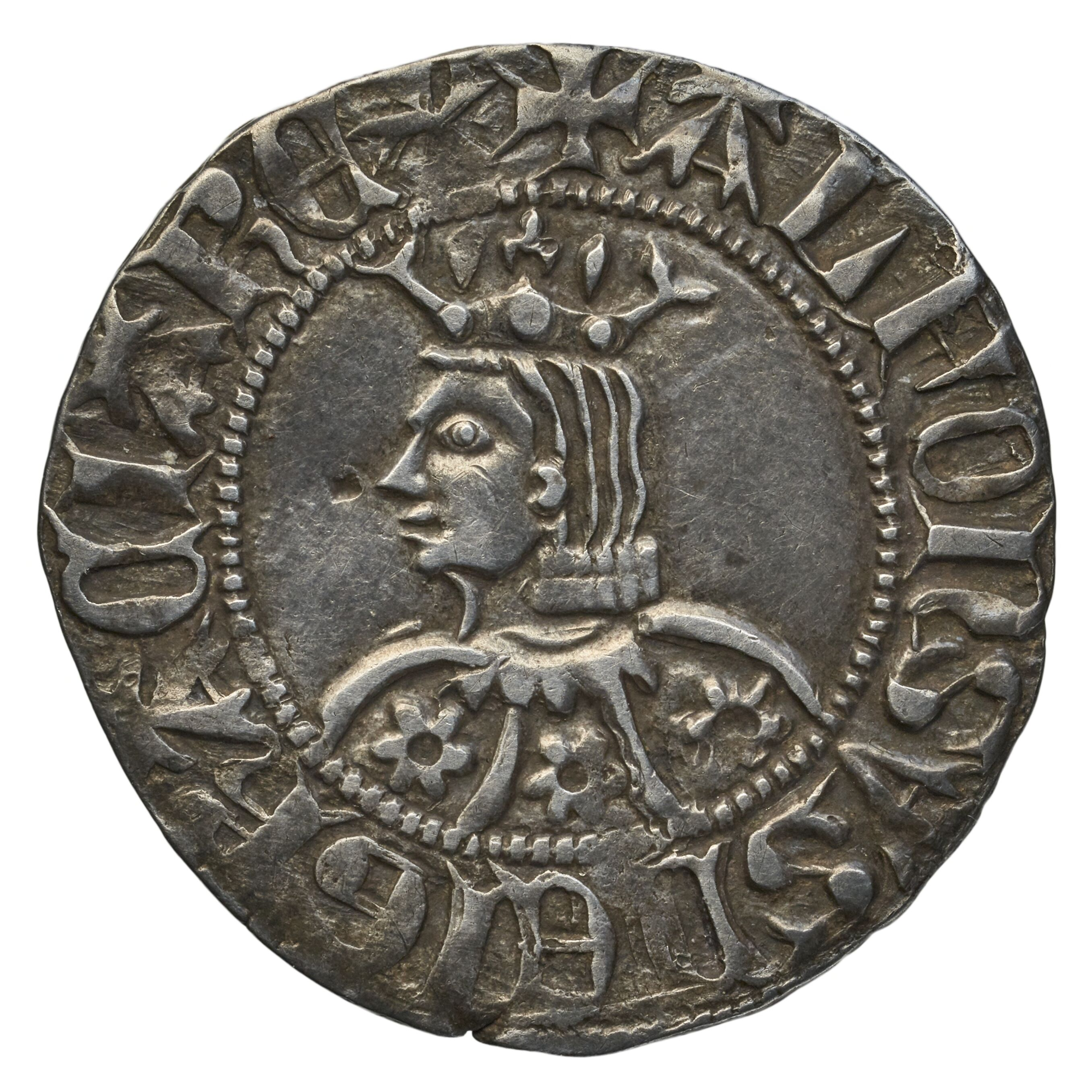
- Coin of Alfonso IV

King of Aragon
- Reign: 2/5 November 1327 – 24 January 1336
- Predecessor: James II
- Successor: Peter IV
- Born: 2 November 1299; Naples, Kingdom of Naples
- Died: 24 January 1336 (aged 36); Barcelona, Principality of Catalonia, Crown of Aragon
- Spouses: Teresa d'Entença (m. 1314; died 1327) Eleanor of Castile (m. 1329)
- Issue among others...: Constance, Queen of Majorca; Peter IV, King of Aragon; James I, Count of Urgell
- House: House of Barcelona
- Father: James II of Aragon
- Mother: Blanche of Anjou

Alfonso IV (2 November 1299 – 24 January 1336), called the Kind (also the Gentle or the Nice, Catalan: Alfons el Benigne), was King of Aragon and Count of Barcelona (as Alfons III) from 1327 to his death. His reign saw the incorporation of the County of Urgell, Duchy of Athens, and Duchy of Neopatria into the Crown of Aragon.

== Biography ==
Alfonso was born in Naples, the second son of James II and Blanche of Anjou. In 1314, aged 14, he married Teresa d'Entença, heiress of Urgell, who was the same age as him. Teresa's granduncle Ermengol X of Urgell had died childless in La Llitera; before his death, he had agreed to make Alfonso his heir, on condition that Alfonso would marry Teresa, who was his nearest kin. Alfonso was at this time only the second son (and not the heir) of the king of Aragon. He and his father readily agreed to Ermengol's condition, and Alfonso married Teresa in 1314 in the Cathedral of Lleida. The teenage bridegroom is reputed to have been so liberal in the expenses during the wedding, that the local counsels imposed restrictions on how much he could spend. Alfonso and Teresa became the parents of seven children.

Alfonso became heir to the throne in December 1319 after his older brother James renounced his rights to become a monk. During the reign of his father, Alfonso was the procurator-general of the Crown, and in 1323–1324, he undertook the conquest of Sardinia.

Alfonso's father and first wife Teresa died within a few days of each other in 1327. Teresa died in childbirth on 20 October 1327, and James II died on 2 November 1327, whereupon Alfonso became king. In 1329, he began a long war with the Republic of Genoa. The city of Sassari had previously surrendered to Alfonso in 1323, but rebelled three more times; its possession was contested by Genoa, which led to the protracted war.

In February 1329, Alfonso married Eleanor of Castile (1308–1359), the sister of king Alfonso XI of Castile. Eleanor had been briefly married to Alfonso's elder brother James the monk. That marriage, which James had refused to consummate, had been annulled in 1319–20. Eleanor had thereafter retired to a convent (although she never took the veil) and had remained unmarried. By December the same year, the couple were rejoiced to become the parents of a son, Ferdinand, who was followed five years later by another son, John.

Eleanor earnestly sought to advance the interests of her own infant sons over those of her stepson, the Infante Peter, who was the heir-apparent. She convinced her husband to grant very large and significant territories to her sons. on 28 December 1329, Alfonso granted his new-born son Ferdinand the Marquisate of Tortosa and the cities of Albarracín, Orihuela, Callosa d'en Sarrià, Guardamar, Alicante, Monforte, Elda, La Mola, Novelda and Aspe. Eleanor's younger son John, who was born five years later, was also granted several lordships when he was only a toddler: Elche, Biel and Bolsa were all bestowed upon him. These territories would be controlled by Eleanor, who had also received the city of Huesca and some other villages and castles belonging to the Aragonese crown at the time of her wedding. Nor was this all. While all of the above grants had been made from among the possessions of the Aragonese crown, the King also sought to bestow estates located within the Kingdom of Valencia upon the toddler Ferdinand, but he was prevented from doing so. When the King granted Ferdinand the cities of Xàtiva, Alzira, Sagunto, Morella, Burriana and Castellón de la Plana, all located in the Kingdom of Valencia, the local subjects protested, and for this reason the King decided to revoked these patents. These grants of land diminished the territorial patrimony of the crown and mainly affected the Infante Peter, Alfonso's son by his first wife, who however was too young to make any significant protest. However, the issue agitated the court, created a climate of resentment and divided the nobility into two camps.

Alfonso died in January 1336, aged only 36. He was succeeded by Peter IV, his 16-year-old son from his first marriage.

== Children ==
By Teresa d'Entença:

- Alfonso (1315–1317)
- Constance (1318–1346), married in 1336 to James III of Majorca.
- Peter IV (1319–1387), successor.
- James I, Count of Urgell (1321–1347), also inherited Entença and Antillon.
- Elizabeth (1323–1327).
- Frederick (1325-died young).
- Sancho (1327), lived only a few days.

By Eleanor of Castile:

- Ferdinand of Aragon (1329–1363), Marquis of Tortosa and Lord of Albarracín and Fraga; married Maria, daughter of Peter I of Portugal, and was killed by order of his brother Peter IV.
- John (1331–1358), Lord of Elche, Biel and Bolsa, married in 1355 to Isabel Núñez de Lara (daughter of Juan Núñez III de Lara) and was killed by order of his cousin Pedro of Castile.

== Sources ==
- Diccionario universal de historia y de geografía, p. 152. By Lucas Alamán, Manuel Orozco y Berra
- Arco y Garay, Ricardo del (1945). Sepulcros de la Casa Real de Aragón (in Spanish). Madrid: Instituto Jerónimo Zurita. Consejo Superior de Investigaciones Científicas. OCLC 11818414.
- Gerli, E. Michael; Armistead, Samuel G., eds. (2003). Medieval Iberia: An Encyclopedia. Routledge.
- O'Callaghan, Joseph F. (1975). A History of Medieval Spain. Cornell University Press.
- Previté-Orton, Charles William (1952). The Shorter Cambridge Medieval History. Vol. II The Twelfth Century to the Renaissance. Cambridge at the University Press.
- Ramón Pont, Antonio (1983). "El infante don Fernando, señor de Orihuela en la guerra de los dos Pedros (1356–1363)" (PDF). Anales de la Universidad de Alicante. Historia Medieval (in Spanish) (2). Alicante: Anales de la Universidad de Alicante. Historia medieval: Universidad de Alicante: Servicio de Publicaciones: 63–92. doi:10.14198/medieval.1983.2.05. hdl:10045/7164. ISSN 0212-2480.

Alfonso IV of Aragon House of Aragon Cadet branch of the House of Barcelona Born: c. 1299 Died: 24 January 1336
Regnal titles
Preceded by James the Just	King of Aragon, Valencia, Sardinia and Corsica; Count of Barcelona; 1327–1336	Succeeded by Peter the Ceremonious
