= Charles of Sicily =

Charles of Sicily may refer to the following kings:

- Charles I of Sicily (r. 1266–1282)
- Charles II of Sicily (r. 1516–1554), also king of Spain and Naples and Holy Roman emperor
- Charles III of Sicily (r. 1665–1700), also king of Spain and Naples
- Charles IV of Sicily (r. 1720–1735), also king of Naples and Holy Roman emperor
- Charles V of Sicily (r. 1735–1759), also king of Spain and Naples
