= Charles II of Naples =

King of Naples from 1284 to 1309

Charles II
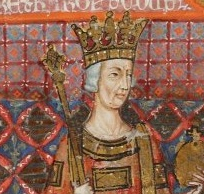
- King Charles II from the Bible of Naples, c. 1340

King of Naples Count of Provence and Forcalquier
- Reign: 7 January 1285 – 5 May 1309
- Coronation: 29 May 1289
- Predecessor: Charles I
- Successor: Robert

Count of Anjou and Maine
- Reign: 7 January 1285 – 16 August 1290
- Predecessor: Charles I
- Successor: Margaret & Charles III

Prince of Achaea
- Reign: 7 January 1285 – 16 September 1289
- Predecessor: Charles I
- Successor: Isabella and Florent

King of Albania
- Reign: 7 January 1285 – 13 August 1294
- Predecessor: Charles I
- Successor: Philip I, Prince of Taranto
- Born: 1254
- Died: 5 May 1309 (aged 54–55); Naples, Kingdom of Naples
- Spouse: Maria of Hungary
- Issue more...: Charles Martel, Prince of Salerno; Margaret, Countess of Anjou; Louis of Toulouse; Robert, King of Naples; Philip II, Latin Emperor; Blanche, Queen of Aragon; Raymond Berengar, Count of Andria; Eleanor, Queen of Sicily; Maria, Queen of Majorca; Peter, Count of Eboli; John, Duke of Durazzo
- House: Anjou-Naples
- Father: Charles I of Naples
- Mother: Beatrice of Provence

Charles II, also known as Charles the Lame (French: Charles le Boiteux; Italian: Carlo lo Zoppo; 1254 – 5 May 1309), was King of Naples, Count of Provence and Forcalquier (1285–1309), Prince of Achaea (1285–1289), and Count of Anjou and Maine (1285–1290); he also was King of Albania (1285–1294), and claimed the Kingdom of Jerusalem from 1285. He was the son of Charles I of Anjou—one of the most powerful European monarchs in the second half of the 13th century—and Beatrice of Provence. His father granted Charles the Principality of Salerno in the Kingdom of Sicily (or Regno) in 1272 and made him regent in Provence and Forcalquier in 1279.

After the uprising known as the Sicilian Vespers against Charles's father, the island of Sicily became an independent kingdom under the rule of Peter III of Aragon in 1282. A year later, his father made Charles regent in the mainland territories of the Regno (or the Kingdom of Naples). Charles held a general assembly where unpopular taxes were abolished and the liberties of the noblemen and clerics were confirmed. He could not prevent the Aragonese from occupying Calabria and the islands in the Gulf of Naples. The Sicilian admiral Roger of Lauria captured him in a naval battle near Naples in 1284. As he was still in prison when his father died on 7 January 1285, his realms were ruled by regents. The remainder of his rule was spent seeking a resolution to the Sicilian war, diplomatic moves concerning his inheritance, and administrating the new Kingdom of Naples.

== Early life ==
Born in 1254, Charles was the son of Charles I of Anjou and Beatrice of Provence. He was the sole heir of his father's vast dominion. By the time of Charles's birth, his father had seized Provence and Forcalquier (in the Holy Roman Empire), Anjou and Maine (in France), and the Kingdom of Sicily (a fief of the Holy See). In the 1270s, his father also proclaimed himself King of Albania (in reference to his conquests along the Eastern coast of the Ionian Sea), partially asserted his claim to the Kingdom of Jerusalem, and inherited Achaea (in the Peloponnese). Charles's mother died in 1267, but his father's determination to keep his empire intact deprived Charles of his maternal inheritance during his father's lifetime.

Charles I arranged a double marriage alliance with Stephen V of Hungary in 1269. Stephen's daughter, Maria was engaged to Charles, and Charles's sister, Isabelle to Maria's brother, Ladislaus. Charles fell seriously ill in late 1271. To encourage prayers for his recovery, his father donated Charles's wax sculptures to churches frequented by pilgrims in the whole kingdom. After Charles recovered, his father made a pilgrimage at the shrine of Saint Nicholas in Bari and sent gifts to the sanctuary of Mary the Virgin at Rocamadour.

Charles was dubbed with his brother, Philip, count of Taranto and some 100 Italian and French noble scions at the feast of Pentecost in 1272. On this occasion, his father Charles I granted him as appanage the Principality of Salerno, a fief customarily held by the heirs apparent to the throne by the previous royal house the Hauteville. The grant to Charles further stipulated that he could not claim more territories as a prince, thus keeping the area of Provence under direct royal rule.

== Regency ==
However, by late 1279 his father appointed him to administer Provence. In December 1280 the duke accompanied his cousin, king Philip III of France, to Toulouse where he met with Peter III of Aragon. Peter III was the son-in-law of Manfred of Sicily who had lost the Kingdom of Sicily to Charles's father in 1266 after the battle at Benevento. Peter insolently ignored Charles during the meeting, although both Philip III and James II of Majorca, who was also present, reminded Peter that Charles was closely related to him.

[B]y no means could [Charles] find a cheerful countenance nor any comfort in ... [Peter III of Aragon]; rather was [Peter] harsh and angry towards him. [Philip III of France] and [James II of Majorca] took [Peter III] into a chamber one day and asked him how it was that he did not speak with [Charles]; that he knew full well that he was his near blood-relation, as he was the son of his cousin, the daughter of the count of Provence and besides, that his wife also, the daughter of the King of Hungary, was his blood-relation. But though there were many ties between them, they could obtain nothing from him in the end. And [Charles] invited [Philip III], [Peter III] and [James II] to a banquet, but [Peter III] would not accept it, wherefore the banquet had to be given up. But [James II] showed great civility to [Charles] and [Charles] to him. And so, on their departure from the interview, [Charles] left with [James II] and [Muntaner] saw them both enter Perpignan, and a great feast was made for them, and [James II] detained [Charles] for eight days.

— Ramon Muntaner The Chronicle

Meanwhile pope Nicholas III attempting to deter Charles I's future power ambitions in Italy, not least to carve for his family a duchy, went in negotiations with Rudolf I the Holy Roman emperor for a reinstatement of the Kingdom of Arles that was to be given to Charles Martel, Charles I's grandson. The dowager queen of France, Margaret of Provence, sister of Beatrice, wife of Charles I, opposed sharply to their plans. However, Charles I's claims on territories of Alphonse of Poitiers on the latter's death would increase substantially his rule on Provence. Pope Martin IV, a staunch supporter of Charles I, published the bull of that convention on the 24th of May 1281, where it prescribed that the erstwhile kingdom's territories, along the duchies of Dauphiné, and Savoy with their vicinities were to be given to child couple, Charles Martel and Clemence, daughter of Rudolf, as appanage and Charles I's son, Charles, duke of Salerno would be its regent. Margaret of Provence pursued the matter further and called the duke Robert ΙΙ of Burgundy, count Otto IV of Burgundy along with some lesser lords to a new meeting at Troyes in autumn of 1281, but as Charles I was preoccupied with the preparations for the full scale crusade against the Byzantine empire and the ruling of the court whether or not he was to inherit Alphonse's lands, he had acknowledged his wife's extent of territories and for the rest of the Burgundian land that they were held in fief, thus appeasing the duke Philip II and the matter ended there.

The heavy taxation, forced loans and purveyance were among the reasons that had caused much discontent within the Italian subjects of Charles I, especially in Sicily, and that precipitated out of a seemingly insignificant cause the eruption of a civic unrest of magnitude that led to a generalised anti-French riot, known today in modern historiography as the Sicilian Vespers, in Palermo on 30 March 1282. The revolt having spread quickly put an end to the Angevin rule on the island, but since they needed a royal overlord they turned to Peter III of Aragon and Constance. Peter arrived in Sicily with a large fleet in late August and was declared king on the 4th of September 1282.

Peter III's army arriving on Sicily meant going in war with Angevin and presumably his unbeknown arrival compelled the partial withdrawal of Charles I's troops from the island. Peter's advance allowed him to send forces to Calabria to attempt ousting the Angevin from the mainland too. However, the duke of Salerno headed a military reinforcement and met his father Charles I at Reggio Calabria. More troops arrived by his two nephews, Robert II, Count of Artois and Peter I of Alençon and checked the Aragonese advance. In late December 1282 Charles I challenged Peter III to a judicial duel to end their conflict on Sicily and it was agreed to take place in six months at Bordeaux. Before leaving in January 1283 Charles I appointed his son Charles, the duke of Salerno as regent of the kingdom. The inexperience of the duke led him to a chain of wrong decisions that by the time Charles I returned to Naples the kingdom was on the brink of collapsing. The news of the duke's capture lit a flame of riot in Naples, but the papal legate Gerard of Parma crushed it at its beginning. Charles I tried to undo the situation and marched with his troops to Calabria and even besieged the town but on the Aragonese relief forces arrival he withdrew to San Martino di Taurianova.

Coat of arms of Charles II of Naples: the arms of the House of Anjou impaled with the cross of the Kingdom of Jerusalem

A general assembly was held at the king's camp near San Martino with the barons, prelates and envoys of the towns and it was decided that the royal monopoly on salt and exchanges of the petty coinage were to be abolished. The assembly also decided that the monarchs were allowed to levy the subventio generalis, a very unpopular tax only after having consulted with representatives of their subjects. The liberties of the noblemen and the clergy were reconfirmed, while the commoners' obligations to contribute in a corvée fashion to the maintenance of the royal fortresses and flee were reduced. The reforms adopted at the assembly made the continuation of his father's active foreign policy impossible.

Charles in his father absence strengthened his ties with native aristocracy by appointing members of the Aquinas, Ruffo and Sanseverino families to his royal council. He also tried to make his father's most unpopular officials scapegoats for some of the abuses that were made during the latter's reign. In June 1283, he ordered the imprisonment of all male members of the della Marre and Rufouli families, two prominent noble families that had often been entrusted with the collection of the taxes and custom duties in Charles I's reign. While the heads of those two families were executed to silence the popular voice, the rest of the incarcerated male members were held to ransom, the release of whom cost huge amounts of money to their relatives.

Charles as a regent could not finance a lengthy war and he resorted to borrowing some thousands of ounces of gold from the Holy See, the kings of France and England, the ruler of Tunis, Tuscan bankers, and from the rest of the towns of the mainland, known as the Regno. Gerard of Parma also persuaded the Southern Italian prelates to cede a part of their revenues to Charles for the war against the rebels and their supporters. He could then equip 40 new galleys in Provence. The Aragonese fleet had meanwhile imposed a blockade on the island of Malta. Charles dispatched his new fleet to the island, but the Sicilian admiral, Roger of Lauria, attacked and almost annihilated the Provençal galleys in the Battle of Malta. Lauria soon occupied the islands of Capri and Ischia, which enabled him to make frequent raids against the Bay of Naples, whereas the capturing of another islet that of Nisida, allowed for the imposion of a blockade in Naples.

== Captivity ==
The inhabitants of Naples urged Charles I to expel the Aragonese from Nisida. Although his father had forbidden him to attack the Aragonese until his arrival, Charles decided to invade the islet. Believing that most Aragonese ships had left the Bay of Naples, he sailed for Nisida on 5 June 1284, but the Aragonese galleys soon surrounded and defeated his fleet. During the battle, Charles fell into captivity. He was first taken to Messina where the crowd demanded his execution in revenge for Conradin (Manfred of Sicily's young nephew, who had been beheaded at Charles I's order in 1268). To save Charles's life, Constance of Sicily—Peter III of Aragon's wife—imprisoned him at the fortress of Cefalù.

Charles I died on 7 January 1285. On his deathbed, he had made Robert of Artois regent for the minor Charles Martel who would rule as vicar general until Charles was released from captivity. The Provençal delegates held a general assembly at Sisteron and decided to do their utmost to secure Charles's release. Pope Martin IV partially ignored Charles I's last will. He did not acknowledge the right either of the captive Charles or of his minor son to rule, claiming that an interregnum followed the king's death. The pope confirmed Artois' regency, but he made Cardinal Gerald co-regent, authorizing them to administer the kingdom on behalf of the Holy See. The regents appointed the most powerful ruler of the Peloponnese, William I de la Roche, Duke of Athens, bailiff of Achaea to secure the local lords' loyalty. Odo Poilechien—who had been made baillif during Charles I's reign—continued to rule Acre which was the only town to acknowledge Charles's rule in the Kingdom of Jerusalem.

Pope Martin died on 29 March 1285. The crusade that he had declared against Aragon started in late May, but Peter III's resistance forced the crusaders to withdraw in September. At Peter's order, Charles was moved from Cefalù to Catalonia. Peter died on 10 November; his eldest sons, Alfonso III and James succeeded him in Aragon and Sicily, respectively. Henry II of Cyprus, who was regarded the lawful king of Jerusalem by most local lords, forced Odo Poilechien to leave Acre in June 1286. Since the Knights Templar and Hospitallers supported Henry, their estates were confiscated in the Regno.

Charles's sons sent a letter to Edward I of England, asking him to intervene to secure their father's release. Edward accepted their offer and mediated a fourteen-month truce in July 1286. James entered into negotiations with Charles about the conditions of Charles's release. Charles was ready to renounce the island of Sicily and Calabria in favor of James for at least the rest of his own lifetime, but Pope Honorius IV sharply opposed this plan. After Honorius died on 3 April 1287, Edward I mediated a compromise, which was completed in the presence of the delegates of the College of Cardinals in Oloron-Sainte-Marie in July. However, Philip IV of France refused to sign it, because it did not arrange for the compensation of his younger brother, Charles of Valois, who had laid claim to Aragon.

The new pope, Nicholas IV, who was enthroned in February 1288, also disapproved the treaty, but allowed Edward I to continue the negotiations. A new agreement, repeating most terms of the previous compromise, was signed at Canfranc in October. According to the treaty, Charles was to be released for a ransom of 50,000 marks of silver, but he also had to promise to mediate a reconciliation between Aragon, France and the Holy See. He pledged that he would send his three sons—Charles Martel, Louis and Robert—and 60 Provençal noblemen as hostages to Aragon to secure the fulfilment of his promise. He also promised that he would return to Aragon if he could not persuade his allies to make peace with Aragon in three years. After Edward I gave further guarantees, Alfonso III released Charles who went to Paris to start negotiations with Philip IV. Philip again repudiated the treaty and Charles left France for Italy to meet with the pope.

== Reign ==
=== Start of his reign ===
Pope Nicholas IV crowned Charles king in Rieti on Whit Sunday 1289. To persuade Charles to continue the war for Sicily, the pope granted the tenth of Church revenues from Southern Italy to him. The pope also absolved Charles from the promises that he had made to secure his release. Edward I of England protested against the pope's decision and continued to mediate between Charles and Alfonso III of Aragon. At Edward's request, Alfonso III released Charles Martel in exchange for Charles's fifth son, Raymond Berengar.

Influenced by Bartolomeo da Capua and his other advisors, Charles adopted a concept about the establishment of a purely Christian kingdom. He ordered the expulsion of the Jews and Lombards from Anjou and Maine, accusing them of usury, and the Jews of "dwelling randomly" with the Christian population and cohabiting with Christian women. He linked the expulsion of the Jews to general taxation of the population as "recompense" for lost income. Applying the blood libel against the Jews of Southern Italy, he forced many of them to convert to Christianity. He also introduced the Inquisition in the Regno.

Alfonso III invaded Charles's realm and laid siege to Gaeta, because he thought that the burghers were ready to rise up against Charles, but the town resisted. Charles Martel and Robert of Artois led troops to the town and surrounded the besiegers. Edward I of England sent envoys to Charles, urging him to respect the treaty of Canfranc. The pope dispatched two cardinals to prevent the reconciliation, but Charles and Alfonse signed a two-year truce. To secure stability in Achaea, Charles decided to restore a line of local rulers in the principality. He arranged a marriage for Isabella of Villehardouin—the daughter of the last native prince, William II—with a successful military commander, Florent of Hainaut. In September, he granted Achaea to them, but he kept his right to suzerainty over the principality and also stipulated that if Florent predeceased her, Isabella could not remarry without his consent.

=== Negotiations ===
Charles left Southern Italy to start new negotiations with Philip IV. Before visiting Paris, he went to the Aragonese frontier to offer himself for imprisonment on 1 November in accordance with the treaty of Canfranc, but nobody came to arrest him. Charles and Philip IV signed a treaty at Senlis on 19 May 1290. Charles gave his daughter, Margaret, in marriage to Charles of Valois, giving Anjou and Maine to him as her dowry in return for his promise to abandon his claim to Aragon with the pope's consent. Philip IV also promised that he would make peace with Aragon as soon as Alfonso III and the Holy See were reconciled.

The envoys of all parties, but James of Sicily, started negotiations with the mediation of English delegates at Perpignan, and continued them in Tarascon in late 1290 and early 1291. They reached a compromise which was included in a treaty in Brignoles on 19 February 1291. The document confirmed most terms of the treaty of Senlis and restored the peace between Alfonso III, Philip IV and Charles. Charles received the districts of Avignon held by the French monarch. The Holy See also accepted the terms of the treaty because Alfonso of Aragon promised that he would lead a crusade against the Mamluks of Egypt.

The treaty of Brignoles deprived Alfonso's brother, James of Sicily, of Aragonese support, but Alfonso unexpectedly died on 18 June. James succeeded Alfonso in Aragon, but he did not want to cede the island of Sicily and Calabria to Charles and made his younger brother, Frederick, his lieutenant. The Mamluks occupied the last strongholds in the Kingdom of Jerusalem in the summer of 1291. Pope Nicholas IV called for a new crusade and urged the Christian "kings, princes and prelates" to send their proposals about the recovery of the Holy Land. Charles was the only monarch to answer the pope. He suggested that the sole grand master of the united military orders, who should be appointed from about the royal princes, was to rule the reconquered Kingdom of Jerusalem.

After realising that his new subjects would not support a war for Sicily, James sent envoys to Rome to start negotiations about his submission shortly before Pope Nicholas died on 4 April 1292. Charles was also willing to reach a compromise, because he wanted to secure Hungary for his family. Charles's brother-in-law, Ladislaus IV of Hungary, had been murdered on 10 July 1290. The Hungarian noblemen elected Ladislaus' cousin, Andrew III, king, although Andrew's legitimacy was doubtful. Charles's wife regarded herself Ladislaus' lawful heir. Claiming that Hungary was the fief of the Holy See, Pope Nicholas IV granted Hungary to her son, Charles Martel, in 1292. The most powerful noblemen in Croatia and Slavonia—two realms ruled by the kings of Hungary—accepted the pope's decision. Charles made donations to them to secure their support, but Charles Martel could never assert his claim.

The death of Pope Nicholas IV gave rise to a prolonged interregnum. Charles continued the negotiations with James with the mediation of Sancho IV of Castile. An agreement was completed in Figueras in late 1293. James agreed to give up Sicily in return for a compensation. To put an end to the interregnum in Rome, Charles persuaded the cardinals to elect Peter of Morrone—a hermit who had been known for his apocalyptic visions—pope. Being grateful to Charles, Pope Celestine V granted him Church revenues from France, the Holy Roman Empire and England to finance a new military campaign against Sicily. After Celestine abdicated in December 1294, the cardinals elected Benedetto Caetani pope. Pope Boniface VIII was determined to put an end to the war, because he wanted to declare a new crusade for the reconquest of the Holy Land.

=== Peace ===
Pope Boniface VIII confirmed the compromise between James and Charles in Anagni on 12 June 1295. However, the Sicilians refused the Treaty of Anagni and James of Aragon's brother, Frederick, was crowned king of Sicily on 12 December 1295. Frederick soon made a raid against Basilicata.

An attempt was made to bribe Frederick into consenting to this arrangement, but being backed up by his people he refused, and was afterwards crowned King of Sicily. The ensuing war was fought on land and sea, but Charles, though aided by the Pope, his cousin Charles of Valois and James, was unable to conquer the island, and his son the prince of Taranto was taken prisoner at the Battle of La Falconara in 1299. Peace was at last made in 1302 at Caltabellotta. Charles gave up all rights to Sicily and agreed to the marriage of his daughter Eleanor and King Frederick; the treaty was ratified by the Pope in 1303. Charles spent his last years quietly in Naples, which city he improved and embellished.

He died in Naples in May 1309, and was succeeded by his son Robert the Wise, with his eldest grandson Charles I of Hungary excluded from Neapolitan succession.

== Family ==
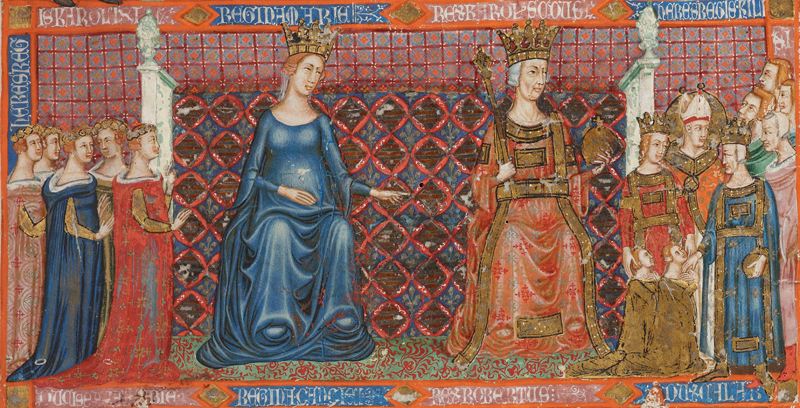
Charles, his wife Mary and their children in the Bible of Naples, 1340

In 1270, he married Maria of Hungary (c. 1257 – 25 March 1323), the daughter of Stephen V of Hungary and Elizabeth the Cuman. They had fourteen children:

1. Charles Martel of Anjou (1271-1295), titular King of Hungary, predeceased his father.
2. Margaret (1272– 31 December 1299), Countess of Anjou and Maine, married at Corbeil 16 August 1290 to Charles of Valois
3. Saint Louis of Toulouse (9 February 1274, Nocera Inferiore – 19 August 1298, Chateau de Brignoles), Bishop of Toulouse
4. Robert the Wise (1276-1343), King of Naples
5. Philip I of Taranto (1278-1331/2), Prince of Achaea and Taranto, Despot of Romania, titular Emperor of Constantinople and titular King of Albania
6. Blanche of Anjou (1280 – 14 October 1310, Barcelona), married at Villebertran 1 November 1295 James II of Aragon
7. Raymond Berengar (1281–1307), Count of Provence, Prince of Piedmont and Andria
8. John (1283 – aft. 16 March 1308), a priest
9. Tristan (1284–bef. 1288)
10. Eleanor of Anjou, (August 1289 – 9 August 1341, Monastery of St. Nicholas, Arene, Elis), married at Messina 17 May 1302 Frederick III of Sicily
11. Maria of Naples (1290 – c. 1346), married at Palma de Majorca 20 September 1304 Sancho I of Majorca, married 1326 Jaime de Ejerica (1298 – April 1335)
12. Peter (1291 – 29 August 1315, Battle of Montecatini), Count of Gravina
13. John of Durazzo (1294 – 5 April 1336, Naples), Duke of Durazzo, Prince of Achaea, and Count of Gravina, married March 1318 (div 1321) Matilda of Hainaut (29 November 1293–1336), married 14 November 1321 Agnes of Périgord (d. 1345)
14. Beatrice (1295 – c. 1321), married April 1305 Azzo VIII d'Este, marchese of Ferrara etc. (d. 1308); she married secondly 1309 Bertrand III of Baux, Count of Andria (d. 1351)

== Ancestry ==
Ancestors of Charles II of Naples

8. Philip II of France
4. Louis VIII of France
9. Isabelle of Hainaut
2. Charles I of Naples
10. Alfonso VIII of Castile
5. Blanche of Castile
11. Eleanor of England
1. Charles II of Naples
12. Alfonso II of Provence
6. Ramon Berenguer IV of Provence
13. Garsenda of Forcalquier
3. Beatrice of Provence
14. Thomas I of Savoy
7. Beatrice of Savoy
15. Margaret of Geneva

== Sources ==
- Abulafia, David (1999). "The kingdom of Sicily under the Hohenstaufen and Angevins". In Abulafia, David (ed.). The New Cambridge Medieval History, Volume 5, c.1198–c.1300. Cambridge: Cambridge University Press. pp. 497–524. ISBN 978-1-13905573-4.
- Bárány, Attila (2010). "The English relations of Charles II of Sicily and Maria of Hungary". In Kordé, Zoltán; Petrovics, István (eds.). Diplomacy in the Countries of the Angevin Dynasty in the Thirteenth–Fourteenth Centuries. Accademia d'Ungheria in Roma. pp. 57–77. ISBN 978-963-315-046-7.
- Dunbabin, Jean (1998). Charles I of Anjou. Power, Kingship and State-Making in Thirteenth-Century Europe. Bloomsbury. ISBN 978-1-78093-767-0.
- Engel, Pál (2001). The Realm of St Stephen: A History of Medieval Hungary, 895–1526. I.B. Tauris Publishers. ISBN 1-86064-061-3.
- Fine, John V. A. (1994) [1987]. The Late Medieval Balkans: A Critical Survey from the Late Twelfth Century to the Ottoman Conquest. Ann Arbor, Michigan: University of Michigan Press. ISBN 978-0-472-10079-8.
- Harris, Jonathan (2014). Byzantium and the Crusades. Longman. ISBN 978-0-582-25370-4.
- Housley, Norman (1982). The Italian Crusades: The Papal-Angevin Alliance and the Crusades against Christian Lay Powers, 1254–1343. Clarendon Press. ISBN 0-19-821925-3.
- Housley, Norman (1984). "Charles II of Naples and the Kingdom of Jerusalem". Byzantion. 54 (2): 527–535. ISSN 0378-2506.
- Huscroft, Richard (2006). Expulsion: England's Jewish Solution. Stroud: Tempus. ISBN 9780752437293. OL 7982808M.
- Lock, Peter (1995). The Franks in the Aegean, 1204–1500. Longman. ISBN 0-582-05139-8.
- Lock, Peter (2006). The Routledge Companion to the Crusades. Routledge. ISBN 9-78-0-415-39312-6.
- Musto, Ronald G. (2003). Apocalypse in Rome: Cola di Rienzo and the Politics of the New Age. University of California Press.
- Musto, Ronald G. (2013). Medieval Naples: A Documentary History, 400–1400. Italica Press.
- Nicol, Donald M. (1984). The Despotate of Epirus, 1267–1479: A Contribution to the History of Greece in the Middle Ages. Cambridge University Press. ISBN 978-0-521-13089-9.
- Runciman, Steven (1958). The Sicilian Vespers: A History of the Mediterranean World in the Later Thirteenth Century. Cambridge University Press. ISBN 978-1-107-60474-2.
- Small, Carola M. (2004). "Charles I of Anjou; Charles II of Anjou". In Kleinhenz, Christopher (ed.). Medieval Italy: An Encyclopedia. Routledge. pp. 212–214. ISBN 978-0-415-93930-0.
- Takayama, Hiroshi (2004). "Law and monarchy in the south". In Abulafia, David (ed.). Italy in the Central Middle Ages, 1000–1300. Oxford University Press. pp. 58–81. ISBN 0-19-924704-8.

Charles II of Naples Capetian House of Anjou Cadet branch of the Capetian dynasty Born: 1254 Died: 5 May 1309
Regnal titles
Preceded by Charles I	King of Naples; 1285–1309	Succeeded by Robert
Preceded by Charles I	King of Albania; 1285–1301	Succeeded by Philip I
Preceded by Charles I	Prince of Achaea; 1285–1289	Succeeded by Isabella
Preceded by Charles I	Count of Anjou and Maine; 1285–1290	Succeeded by Margaret & Charles III
Preceded by Beatrice	Count of Provence and Forcalquier; 1267–1309	Succeeded by Robert or Raymond Berengar V
