= Copper Green =

Code name for a U.S. black ops program

Copper Green is reportedly one of several code names for a U.S. black ops program in which coercive psychological and physical measures were used on detainees in military prisons.

== Overview ==
Investigative journalist Seymour Hersh reported on the term in an article in the May 24, 2004 issue of The New Yorker. According to Hersh, the task force was formed with the direct approval of Secretary of Defense Donald Rumsfeld during the U.S. invasion of Afghanistan, and run by Deputy Undersecretary Stephen Cambone. Hersh claims the Special Access Program (SAP) members were told "Grab whom you must. Do what you want." The program allegedly designed physical coercion and sexual humiliation techniques for use against Muslim Arab men specifically, to retrieve information from suspects, and to blackmail them into becoming informants.

According to Hersh's article, the sexual humiliation techniques drew from The Arab Mind by cultural anthropologist Raphael Patai. The book claimed to be a "study of Arab culture and psychology". According to Hersh's anonymous intelligence source, the Patai book was "the bible of the neocons on Arab behavior", which gave life to two themes: "One, that Arabs only understand force and, two, that the biggest weakness of Arabs is shame and humiliation".

Hersh claims to have spoken to a senior CIA official who said the program was designed by Rumsfeld to wrest control of information from the CIA and place it in the hands of the Pentagon. According to Hersh's sources, the program was so successful in Afghanistan, that Cambone decided to introduce the SAP program to operations during 2003 invasion of Iraq, eventually expanding involvement in the program from special ops forces to common soldiers. In Hersh's view, the program was used on detainees at the Abu Ghraib prison, leading directly to the Abu Ghraib torture and prisoner abuse scandal.

Department of Defense spokesperson Lawrence Di Rita issued a statement about the accusations, referring to them as "outlandish, conspiratorial, and filled with error and anonymous conjecture". Senators on Capitol Hill, most notably the former POW John McCain, promised to investigate the reported claims, "regardless of where it leads".

== In popular culture ==
Copper Green was mentioned in author JD Wallace's debut novel, Silent Cats: Deadly Dance. The male hero, who is based on a real person who the author claims to know personally, was an interrogator who worked on the Copper Green task force, among other task force groups.

Copper Green was mentioned in Lt. Col. Anthony Shaffer's memoir, Operation Dark Heart on page 257: "The interrogation program, called Copper Green, was authorized, but a lot of us felt it wasn't appropriate and just wasn't right." The Pentagon blacked out the words "Copper Green" in the second printing.
