= Raimon de Tors de Marseilha =

Raimon de Tors de Marseilha (fl. 1257–1265) was a Provençal troubadour. He hailed from the "city of towers (tors)", a district of Marseille (Marseilha in Provençal) where the local bishop owned many towers. He wrote six moral and political sirventes found in surviving manuscripts. Raimon's most interesting and entertaining song is undoubtedly his complaint against mothers-in-law, A totz maritz mand e dic.

Raimon was equally sympathetic to the Guelphs and Ghibellines in the contemporary wars in Italy, speaking favourable of the cause of Guelph Charles of Anjou and that of the Ghibelline Henry of Castile. He also had great affection for Alfonso X of Castile, but never visited Spain. Like many contemporary troubadours on either side he hated "false clerics" and denigrates them extensively in his poetry.

Metrically and rhythmically, Raimon imitated the Apres mon vers vueilh sempr'ordre of Raimbaut d'Aurenga in his own Ar es dretz q'ieu chan e parlle.

== Sources ==
- Riquer, Martín de. Los trovadores: historia literaria y textos. 3 vol. Barcelona: Planeta, 1975.
