= Saba Malaspina =

Italian historian and clergyman d 1297/1298

Saba Malaspina (died 1297 or 1298) was an Italian historian, writer, and clergyman. Born around the mid-13th century in southern Italy, he was from a "Roman family with a strong tradition of support for the papal cause" and was the deacon (later bishop) of the diocese of Mileto. Little is known about his early years and education. His honorific of magister indicates that he studied at a university. In 1275, he collected tithes for crusading on Pope Gregory X's behalf. Around 1283, while serving as the amanuensis of Pope Martin IV, Malaspina began writing the Liber gestorum regum Sicilie; (Note: Translated into English as the Book of the Deeds of the Kings of Sicily or Book of the Events of the Kingdom of Sicily.) he finished writing his history of Sicily on 29 March 1285, by which time he had already obtained Roman citizenship.

Drawing upon records from both the Angevin and papal archives, the Liber begins with the birth of Manfred in 1232 and ends with the death of Charles of Anjou in 1285, with a focus on the events after the death of Frederick II (Manfred's father) in 1250. In writing the Liber, Malaspina was particularly influenced by the Aeneid by Virgil. He dedicated the ten-volume work to the members of the Roman Curia.

Étienne Baluze published the first edition in 1713, although only of the years down to 1276. The first complete edition was published by Giuseppe Del Re posthumously in 1868. The latest edition, titled Die Chronik des Saba Malaspina by its editors, came out in 1999.

On 12 July 1286, Pope Honorius IV ordained Malaspina as bishop of Mileto. In 1288 or 1289, Malaspina was captured by the forces of Roger of Lauria when they occupied Mileto. He successfully escaped and fled to Larino, where he became the local parish administrator. In 1295, Pope Boniface VIII formally named him as the "spiritual and temporal administrator of Larino". Saba Malaspina died in late 1297 or early 1298.

Although traditionally seen as an apologist and propagandist for the papacy, Clifford R. Backman argues that Malaspina was a "reluctantly charmed, enamored-yet-critical admirer of Charles of Anjou". On the other hand, Michael Lower suggests that he was "disillusioned" with Charles' rule. Marc Laureys describes him as "the only important Roman historiographer from the 13th century", while Backman writes that Malaspina was both a "professional scribe of such high standing" and a "literary artist of considerable ability". The Encyclopedia of the Medieval Chronicle regards Malaspina's Sicilian chronicle as "one of the most important sources for the history of Southern Italy".
