= Treaty of Canfranc =

1288 treaty between England and Aragon

The Treaty of Canfranc was an agreement, signed in October 1288, between Edward I of England and Alfonso III of Aragon about the release of Charles II of Naples, who had been captured by the Admiral of Sicily, Roger of Lauria, in a naval battle on 5 June 1284.

== Sources ==
- Bárány, Attila (2010). "The English relations of Charles II of Sicily and Maria of Hungary". In Kordé, Zoltán; Petrovics, István (eds.). Diplomacy in the Countries of the Angevin Dynasty in the Thirteenth–Fourteenth Centuries. Accademia d'Ungheria in Roma. pp. 57–77. ISBN 978-963-315-046-7.
- Runciman, Steven (1958). The Sicilian Vespers: A History of the Mediterranean World in the Later Thirteenth Century. Cambridge University Press. ISBN 978-1-107-60474-2.
