= The Jewish Mind =

Book by Raphael Patai

- Author: Raphael Patai
- Publisher: Scribner
- Publication date: 1977

The Jewish Mind is a non-fiction cultural psychology book by cultural anthropologist Raphael Patai first published in 1977.

== Contents ==
Part I, "Preliminaries", lays the groundwork for the rest of the book. Part II, "Six Great Historic Encounters", reviews the formative and lasting influences on the Jewish mind of each period. In Part III, Patai analyzes the specific traits, characteristics and values shaping the Jewish mind during the prolonged and diverse Gentile exposure.

== See also ==
- The Arab Mind
