= The Arab Mind =

1973 book by Raphael Patai

- Title page for The Arab Mind (1973)
- Author: Raphael Patai
- Language: English
- Genre: Non-fiction
- Publication date: 1973
- Pages: 376
- ISBN: 978-0-684-13306-5

The Arab Mind is a non-fiction cultural psychology book by Hungarian-born, Jewish cultural anthropologist Raphael Patai. He also wrote The Jewish Mind. The book advocates a tribal-group-survival explanation for the driving factors behind Arab culture. It was first published in 1973 and later revised in 1983. A 2007 reprint was further "updated with new demographic information about the Arab world".

== Contents ==
In describing his interest in his subject, Patai writes in the original preface to his book: "When it comes to the Arabs, I must admit to an incurable romanticism; nay more than that: to having had a life-long attachment to Araby."

Along with prefaces, a conclusion, and a postscript, the book contains 16 chapters, including on Arab child-rearing practices, three chapters on Bedouin influences and values, Arab language, Arab art, sexual honor/repression, freedom/hospitality/outlets, Islam's impact, unity and conflict and conflict resolution, and Westernization. A four-page comparison to Spanish America is made in Appendix II. The Foreword is by Norvell B. DeAtkine, Director of Middle East Studies at the John F. Kennedy Special Warfare Center and School at Fort Bragg.

== Reception ==
The book came to public attention in 2004, after investigative journalist Seymour Hersh, writing for The New Yorker, reported that an academic told him the book was "the bible of the neocons on Arab behavior." Hersh reported: "The notion that Arabs are particularly vulnerable to sexual humiliation became a talking point among pro-war Washington conservatives in the months before the March 2003, invasion of Iraq. One book that was frequently cited was The Arab Mind.”

Not only was the book a point of discussion among politicians and policymakers, but it was actively distributed by the Pentagon to the U.S. Armed Forces as a purported pedagogical tool during the U.S. War on Terror.

Patai is criticized at several points in Edward Said's book Orientalism; he writes that the book functions:

...to eradicate the plurality of differences among the Arabs (whoever they may be in fact) in the interest of one difference, that one setting Arabs off from everyone else.

Other scholars describe the book as simplistic, reductionist, stereotyping, generic, racist, essentialist, outdated, superseded, flawed, unscientific, coldhearted, and even intellectually dishonest. The book has been compared to Fouad Ajami's The Arab Predicament (1992) and Hilal Khashan's Arabs at the Crossroads (2000). It is worth noting that some other scholars, including Arab scholars such as Mohammad Al-Jabri, used the concept of "Arab mind" or "Arab reason" to different effect. Scholar Fouad M. Moughrabi observed that this book is not an isolated incident, but rather part of a wider pseudo-intellectual trend, writing:

A substantial number of social-psychological studies dealing with the Arab world purport to explain the 'Arab basic personality', or 'the Arab mind'...Furthermore, the core of this research is often relied upon by many in the media and in the professions to explain everything ranging from internal political rivalries in the Arab world to the Arab-Israeli conflict...The use of terms such as the 'Arab mind' or the 'Arab basic personality', unscientific and demeaning to the subject of research, reveals a dangerous and misleading tendency toward categorical and sweeping generalizations which are not conducive to an enlightened search for better understanding of collective behavior.

The Racism Watch organisation reported in June 2004 that Manning Marable, Columbia University director of African American Studies, had called for immediate action to be taken to end the U.S. military's use of the book. This was followed by a surge of media interest in the book during the summer of 2004.

The book was described by The Guardian correspondent Brian Whitaker as one that presents "an overwhelmingly negative picture of the Arabs." According to a 2004 Boston Globe article by Emram Qureshi, the book's methodology is "emblematic of a bygone era of scholarship focused on the notion of a 'national character,' or personality archetype".

== See also ==
- Islamic culture
- Arab world
- Orientalism
- Shame society vs guilt society
  - Bedouin systems of justice
  - Honor codes of the Bedouin
  - Guilt-Shame-Fear spectrum of cultures
