= Raphael Patai =

Hungarian-Jewish ethnographer, historian, and anthropologist

- רפאל פטאי
- Born: Ervin György Patai; 22 November 1910; Budapest, Austria-Hungary
- Died: 20 July 1996 (aged 85); Tucson, Arizona, United States
- Education: University of Budapest (Budapest Rabbinical Seminary, ordination), University of Breslau (PhD in Semitic languages and Oriental history), Hebrew University of Jerusalem (first PhD, 1936)
- Occupations: Ethnographer; Historian; Anthropologist
- Known for: Cultural development of ancient Hebrews; Jewish history and culture; Middle Eastern anthropology
- Spouse: Naomi Tolkowsky
- Relatives: Saul Patai (brother)
- Awards: Bialik Prize for Jewish thought (1936); National Jewish Book Award (1976)

Raphael Patai (Hebrew: רפאל פטאי; November 22, 1910 − July 20, 1996), born Ervin György Patai, was a Hungarian-Jewish ethnographer, historian, anthropologist, and ordained rabbinical scholar.

== Family background ==
Patai was born in Budapest, Austria-Hungary in 1910 to Edith Patai, née Ehrenfeld, and József Patai. Patai's mother was born in Nagyvárad to German-speaking, Jewish parents who expressed their commitment to Magyar Hungarian nationalism by sending their daughter to Hungarian-language schools. Both parents spoke Hungarian and German fluently and educated their children to be perfectly fluent in both languages. His father was a prominent literary figure, author of numerous Zionist and other writings, including a biography of Theodor Herzl. József was founder and editor of the Jewish political and cultural journal Mult és jövő, (Past and Future) from 1911 to 1944, a journal that was revived in 1988 by János Köbányai in Budapest. József Patai also wrote an early History of Hungarian Jews and founded a Zionist organization in Hungary that procured support for the settlement of Jews in the British Mandate of Palestine.

== Education ==
Raphael Patai studied at rabbinical seminaries in and at the University of Budapest and the University of Breslau, from which he received a PhD in Semitic languages and Oriental history. He moved to Palestine in 1933, where his parents joined him in 1939, after he received the first doctorate awarded by the Hebrew University of Jerusalem, in 1936. He returned briefly to Budapest, where he completed his ordination at the Budapest Rabbinical Seminary.

== Career ==
During the late 1930s and early 1940s Patai taught at the Hebrew University and served as the secretary of the Haifa Technion. He founded the Palestine Institute of Folklore and Ethnology in 1944, serving as its director of research for four years. He also served as scientific director of a Jewish folklore studies program for the Beit Ha'Am public cultural program in Jerusalem.

In 1947 Patai went to New York with a fellowship from the Viking Fund for Anthropological Research (later renamed the Wenner-Gren Foundation for Anthropological Research); he also studied the Jews of Mexico. Patai settled in the United States, becoming a naturalized citizen in 1952. He held visiting professorships at a number of the country's most prestigious colleges, including Columbia, the University of Pennsylvania, New York University, Princeton, and Ohio State. He held full professorships of anthropology at Dropsie College from 1948 to 1957 and Fairleigh Dickinson University. In 1952 he was asked by the United Nations to direct a research project on Syria, Lebanon and Jordan for the Human Relations Area Files.

Patai's work was wide-ranging but focused primarily on the cultural development of the ancient Hebrews and Israelites, on Jewish history and culture, and on the anthropology of the Middle East generally. He was the author of hundreds of scholarly articles and several dozen books, including three autobiographical volumes. In 1985 he was a contributor to an exhibit at the Museum of New Mexico.

== Awards ==
In 1936, Patai was the co-recipient (jointly with Moshe Zvi Segal) of the Bialik Prize for Jewish thought.

In 1976, Patai was awarded the National Jewish Book Award in the Jewish History category for The Myth of the Jewish Race.

== Personal life ==
Patai married Naomi Tolkowsky, whose family had moved to what was then Palestine in the early twentieth century; they had two daughters, Jennifer (born 1942) and Daphne (born 1943). He died in 1996 in Tucson, Arizona, at the age of 85. Longtime Hebrew University of Jerusalem organic chemistry professor Saul Patai (1918–1998) was his brother.

== Selected bibliography ==
=== Own writings ===
- Arab Folktales from Palestine and Israel. Detroit: Wayne State University Press. 1998. ISBN 9780814327104.
- The Children of Noah: Jewish seafaring in ancient times. Princeton: N.J.: Princeton University Press. 1998.
- Jadåid al-Islām: The Jewish "new Muslims" of Meshhed. Detroit: Wayne State University Press. 1997.
- The Jewish Mind. Detroit: Wayne State University Press. 1996 [1973].
- The Jews of Hungary: History, culture, psychology. Detroit: Wayne State University Press. 1996.
- The Jewish Alchemists: A history and source book. Princeton, N.J.: Princeton University Press. 1994. ISBN 0691006423.
- Thinkers and teachers of modern Judaism. New York, N.Y.: Paragon House. 1994. (with Emanuel S. Goldsmith)
- The Hebrew Goddess (3rd enl. ed.). Detroit, Mich.: Wayne State University Press. 1990.
- The Myth of the Jewish Race (Rev. ed.). Detroit: Wayne State University Press. 1989. (with Jennifer Patai)
- Gates to the Old City: A book of Jewish legends. Northvale, N.J.: J. Aronson. 1988.
- Apprentice in Budapest: Memories of a world that is no more. Salt Lake City: University of Utah Press. 1988. ISBN 9780874802870.
- Nahum Goldmann: His missions to the Gentiles. University, Alabama: University of Alabama Press. 1987. ISBN 9780817302948.
- The Seed of Abraham: Jews and Arabs in contact and conflict (1st paperback ed.). Salt Lake and New York: Scribner and UUP. 1987 [1986].
- The Kingdom of Jordan. Westport, Conn.: Greenwood Press. 1984.
- The Arab Mind (Rev. ed.). New York: Scribner with introduction by Norvell de Atkine, Hatherleigh Press. 2002 [1973].
- On Jewish folklore. Detroit: Wayne State University Press. 1983.
- Gates to the Old City: A book of Jewish legends. New York and Detroit: Avon and Wayne State University Press. 1981 [1980].
- The Messiah texts. New York and Detroit: Avon and Wayne State University Press. 1979.
- Jordan, Lebanon, and Syria: An annotated bibliography. Westport, Conn: Greenwood Press. 1973.
- Tents of Jacob: The Diaspora, Yesterday and Today. Englewood Cliffs, N.J.: Prentice Hall. 1971. ISBN 9780139034763.
- Encyclopedia of Zionism and Israel. New York: Herzl Press. 1971.
- Essays in Zionist history and thought. New York: Herzl Press.
- The Hebrew goddess. New York: KTAV Publishing House. 1968. Reprint with an introduction by Merlin Stone
- Golden River to Golden Road: Society, culture, and change in the Middle East (2nd ed.). Philadelphia: University of Pennsylvania Press. 1967.
- Women in the modern world. New York: Free Press. 1967.
- Sex and the Family in the Bible and the Middle East. Garden City, N.Y: Doubleday. 1959.
- The Kingdom of Jordan. Princeton: Princeton University Press. 1958.
- Israel Between East and West - A Study in Human Relations. Jewish Publication Society. 1953. ISBN 9780598687029.
- Man and Temple in Ancient Jewish Myth and Ritual. New York: Nelson. 1947.

=== Co-authorship ===
- Patai, Raphael; Goldsmith, Emanuel S. (1995). Events and Movements in Modern Judaism. New York: Paragon House.
- Patai, József; Patai, Raphael (1995). Souls and Secrets: Hasidic stories. Northvale, N.J.: J. Aronson.
- Brauer, Erich; Patai, Raphael (1993). The Jews of Kurdistan. Detroit: Wayne State University Press.
- Goldziher, Ignác; Patai, Raphael (1987). Ignaz Goldziher and his Oriental diary: A translation and psychological portrait. Detroit: Wayne State University Press. ISBN 9780814318423.
- Graves, Robert; Patai, Raphael (1983). Hebrew myths: The book of Genesis. New York: Greenwich House.
- Patai, Raphael; Rosow, Eugene; Kleiman, Vivian (1981) [1980]. The vanished worlds of Jewry. London and New York: Weidenfeld and Nicolson.
- Patai, Raphael; Patai, Jennifer (1975). The Myth of the Jewish race. New York: Scribner. ISBN 9780684139067.
- Patai, Raphael; Utley, Francis Lee; Noy, Dov (1973). Studies in Biblical and Jewish folklore. New York: Haskell House Publishers.

=== Autobiography ===
- Patai, Raphael (2000). Journeyman in Jerusalem: Memories and Letters 1933-1947. Lanham, MD: Lexington Books.

=== Secondary sources ===
- Graves, Robert; Patai, Raphael (1964). Hebrew myths: The Book of Genesis (1st ed.). Garden City, N.Y.: Doubleday.
- Sanua, Victor D. (1983). Fields of Offerings: Studies in honor of Raphael Patai. Rutherford N.J.: Fairleigh Dickinson University Press.

== See also ==
- Copper Green
- List of Bialik Prize recipients
