= Norman Housley =

Professor of history

Norman Housley (born 19 December 1952) is a professor emeritus of history at the University of Leicester.

Educated at the University of Cambridge, Housley was a research student of Jonathan Riley-Smith. He was research fellow in history at Girton College in 1979 and came to the University of Leicester in 1983. He retired after a long and distinguished career in 2016.

Housley is an authority on the history of the crusading movement and has written several books on the subject. His books encompass largely the period between 1200 and 1580; more recently, however, the scope of Housley's work has focused on the 15th and early 16th centuries.

== Recent publications ==
=== Books ===
- N. J. Housley, Fighting for the Cross. Crusading to the Holy Land (Yale University Press, 2008)
- N. J. Housley, (editor), Knighthoods of Christ:Essays on the History of the Crusades and the Knights Templar, Presented to Malcolm Barber (Ashgate, 2007).
- N. J. Housley, Contesting the Crusades (Blackwell, 2006).
- N. J. Housley, (editor), Crusading in the Fifteenth Century: Message and Impact (Palgrave Macmillan, 2004).
- N. J. Housley, (co-editor with Marcus Bull), The Experience of Crusading, 1, Western Approaches (Cambridge University Press, 2003).
- N. J. Housley, Religious Warfare in Europe, 1400–1536 (Oxford University Press, 2002).
- N. J. Housley, Crusading and Warfare in Medieval and Renaissance Europe, Variorum Collected Studies Series (Ashgate Publishing Ltd, 2001).
- Norman Housley, (editor and translator), Documents on the Later Crusades, 1274-1580, Documents in History Series (New York: Palgrave Macmillan, 1996).
- Norman Housley, The Later Crusades, 1274-1580: From Lyons to Alcazar (Oxford: Oxford University Press, 1992).
- N. J. Housley, The Italian Crusades: The Papal-Angevin Alliance and the Crusades Against Christian Lay Powers, 1254-1343 (Oxford University Press, 1982).

=== Articles and chapters ===
- Norman Housley, 'Indulgences for Crusading, 1417-1517', in Promissory Notes on the Treasury of Merit: Indulgences in late medieval Europe (Leiden: Brill, 2006), 277-308.
- N.J Housley, 'Perceptions of crusading in the mid-fourteenth century: the evidence of three texts', Viator 36 (2005), 415–33
- N.J Housley, 'One man and his wars: the depiction of warfare by Marshal Boucicaut’s biographer', Journal of Medieval History 29 (2003), 27–40
- N.J Housley, 'Explaining defeat: Andrew of Regensburg and the Hussite crusades', in Dei gesta per Francos: Études sur les croisades dédiées à Jean Richard, ed. M. Balard, B. Z. Kedar and J. Riley-Smith, (Aldershot, 2001), 87–95
- N.J Housley, 'Holy Land or holy lands? Jerusalem and the Catholic West in the late Middle Ages and Renaissance', in The Holy Land, Holy Lands, and Christian History, ed. R.N. Swanson (Woodbridge, 2000), 228–49
- N.J Housley, 'Pro deo et patria mori: sanctified patriotism in Europe, 1400–1600', in War and Competition between States, ed. P. Contamine (Oxford, 2000), 221–48
- Norman Housley, 'The Eschatological Imperative: Messianism and Holy War in Europe", in Toward the Millennium: Messianic Expectations from the Bible to Waco (Leiden: Brill, 1998), 123-50.
