= Subventio generalis =

Direct tax in the Kingdom of Sicily

The subventio generalis (or "general aid"), also known as collecta, was a direct tax in the medieval Kingdom of Sicily.

== Origins ==
The subventio generalis had its origins in the obligation of the holders of fiefs in the Kingdom of Sicily to provide military service to the monarchs. They were required to serve in the royal army without compensation for maximum 90 days for each 20 ounces of their annual income. They could get rid of this irksome duty, if they pay a special fee, known as adohamentum or adoha. Most barons and counts preferred to pay the fee which thus developed into a tax already under the Norman kings of Sicily. The landowners collected the fee from their tenants, thus in practice the peasants were to pay the adoha. Those who lived in the royal demesne—all burghers and the majority of the peasantry—were subjected to levies in money or in kind, known as collecta. The monarchs could in theory freely demand such levies, only their fear of riots limited their greed.

The Holy Roman Emperor, Frederick II, who was also king of Sicily, summoned the host in each year after 1231. This practice enabled him to annually collect the adoha, transforming it into a regular tax. The adoha and the collecta were not differentiated from 1238 and they were united three years later.

== Sources ==
- Percy, William A. (1981). "The Earliest Revolution Against the "Modern State": Direct Taxation in Medieval Sicily and the Vespers". Italian Quarterly. XXII (84): 69–83. ISSN 0021-2954.
- Sakellariou, Eleni (2011). Southern Italy in the Late Middle Ages: Demographic, Institutional and Economic Change in the Kingdom of Naples, c.1440-c.1530. BRILL. ISBN 9789004224063.
