= List of Majorcan royal consorts =

Majorca arms.

This is a list of consorts of the Kingdom of Majorca.

== Queen consort of Majorca ==
=== House of Aragon ===
Picture	Name	Father	Birth	Marriage	Became Consort	Ceased to be Consort	Death	Spouse
	Violant of Hungary	Andrew II of Hungary (Árpád)	1215/6	8 September 1235		12 October 1251		James I
	Esclaramunda of Foix	Roger IV, Count of Foix (Foix)	1250-60	1272 or 12 October 1275		1285; Annexation of Majorca	after 22 November 1299	James II
	Isabella of Castile de facto	Sancho IV of Castile (Anscarids)	1283	1 December 1291		25 April 1295 marriage annulled	24 July 1328	James II of Aragon
	Esclaramunda of Foix	Roger IV, Count of Foix (Foix)	1250-60	1272 or 12 October 1275	20 June 1295; Return of Majorca	after 22 November 1299		James II
	Maria of Anjou	Charles II of Naples (Anjou-Sicily)	1290	1309	29 May 1311 husband's accession	4 September 1324 husband's death	end of April 1346/January 1347	Sancho
	Constance of Aragon	Alfonso IV of Aragon (Barcelona)	1318	24 September 1336		1344; Conquest of Majorca	1346	James III

== See also ==
- List of Hispanic consorts
- List of Aragonese consorts
- Countess of Barcelona
- List of consorts of Montpellier
- List of Castilian consorts
- List of Asturian consorts
- List of Leonese consorts
- List of Galician consorts
- List of Navarrese consorts
- List of Spanish consorts
- Lady of Balaguer
