= List of ladies consort of Montpellier =

Ladies of Montpellier, consorts of Lords of Montpellier, include:

== House of William, 986–1213 ==
Picture	Name	Father	Birth	Marriage	Became Consort	Ceased to be Consort	Death	Spouse
	Engelrada	granddaughter of Bernard I, Count of Melgueil	-	-	975 husband's accession	986 husband's death	-	Guy
	Beliarde	-	-	-	1019/25 husband's accession	1025/42/59 husband's death	-	William II Bernard
	Ermengarda of Melgueil	probably Raymond I, Count of Melgueil	-	before 1073	1058/68 husband's accession	1068/77/85 husband's death	1109	Bernard William IV
	Ermensenda de Melgueil	Peter, Count of Melgueil	-	after 1080	1077/85/90 husband's accession	1021/22 husband's death	after 5 June 1156	William V
	Sibylla	probably Boniface del Vasto (Aleramici)	-	August 1129	1021/22 husband's accession	before 11 December 1146		William VI
	Matilda of Burgundy	Hugh II, Duke of Burgundy (Burgundy)	1135	25 February 1157	1146/62 husband's accession	1172 husband's death	before 29 September 1173	William VII
	Eudokia Komnēnē	Isaac Komnenos (Komnenoi)	1150/52	1179/80		April 1187 divorce	November 1202/June 1204	William VIII
	Agnes	an Aragonese	-	April/May 1187, bigamously		1194 marriage declared void by the Pope	after 4 November 1202	William VIII

== House of Aragon, 1213–1349 ==
Picture	Name	Father	Birth	Marriage	Became Consort	Ceased to be Consort	Death	Spouse
	Eleanor of Castile	Alfonso VIII of Castile (Anscarids)	1202	6 February 1221		April 1229 marriage annulled	1244	James I
	Violant of Hungary	Andrew II of Hungary (Árpád)	1215/6	8 September 1235		12 October 1251		James I
	Teresa Gil de Vidaure	Juan de Vidaure	-	1237?		1252?	-	James I
	Esclaramunda of Foix	Roger IV, Count of Foix (Foix)	1250	1272 or 12 October 1275	27 July 1276 husband's accession	22 November 1299		James II
	Maria of Anjou	Charles II of Naples (Anjou-Sicily)	1290	20 September 1304 or 1309	29 May 1311 husband's accession	4 September 1324 husband's death	end April 1346/January 1347	Sancho
	Constance of Aragon	Alfonso IV of Aragon (Barcelona)	1318	24 September 1336		1346		James III
	Violante de Vilaragut	Berenguer de Vilaragut	-	10 November 1347		13 April 1349; Montpellier passed to Philip VI of France and became a part of the Crown of France	before 1372	James III

Part of the Crown of France (1349–1371)

== House of Évreux, 1371–1378, 1381–1382 ==
Picture	Name	Father	Birth	Marriage	Became Consort	Ceased to be Consort	Death	Spouse
	Joan of Valois	John II of France (Valois)	24 June 1343	12 February 1352	1371-2 husband's accession	3 November 1373		Charles I
Return to the Crown of France (1378–1381).
	Eleanor of Castile	Henry II of Castile (Trastámara)	after 1363	27 May 1375	1381 husband's accession	1382 husband's deposition	27 February 1416	Charles II
Return to the Crown of France.
