= Hélène of Anjou =

Daughter of the King of Naples (died 1342)

Hélène Anjou Elena d'Angiò
- Countess of Mat
- Arms of the Capetian House of Anjou

Countess of Mat
- Tenure: 1338–1342
- Successor: Voisava Balsha (As Princess Consort of Albania)
- Born: c. 1300s Kingdom of Naples
- Died: 1342; Kingdom of Naples
- Spouses: Andrea I Thopia (m. 1338)
- Issue: Karl Thopia; Gjergj I Thopia
- House: Capetian House of Anjou
- Father: Robert, King of Naples
- Mother: Unknown

Hélène of Anjou (Italian: Elena d'Angiò; French: Hélène d'Anjou), also known as Helen, was a French noblewoman and member of the Capetian House of Anjou. She was due to marry a French gentleman as part of a political alliance made by her father, Robert of Anjou, but instead married the Albanian nobleman Andrea I Thopia. Both she and her husband were executed by her father.

== Life ==
Hélène was the illegitimate daughter of Robert of Anjou, who was the King of the Kingdom of Naples. The identity of her mother remains unknown, and little is known about her early life.

When Hélène came of age, her father, Robert of Anjou, King of Naples, sent her to marry a French gentleman of Greece, possibly Bertrand de Baux, the Bailli of Morea, or the Prince of Morea, as part of a political alliance. However, during her journey, her ship was caught in a storm and driven off course to Durrës, where she remained for several days. During this time, she met Andrea I Thopia, a nobleman from the prominent Thopia family in Albania, and they fell in love, deciding to live together and marry soon after in 1338. However, some sources identify him as Tanush Thopia, leading to conflicting accounts about the precise identity and name of her Albanian noble husband. They had two sons, Karl Thopia and Gjergj I Thopia.

== Death ==
Angered by Hélène’s marriage to Thopia instead of the French nobleman he had intended for her, King Robert invited the couple to Naples under the pretense of reconciliation, only to deceitfully have them both executed upon their arrival for what he considered their dishonorable actions. Their sons fled to Albania, escaping the fate of their parents, and were raised in the Fortress of Krujë, where Karl, driven by a desire to avenge their deaths, led a rebellion in 1358, overthrowing the last descendants of the Counts of Zante.

== Family ==
Hélène of Anjou married Andrea I Thopia. The couple had two children:

1. Karl Thopia, Prince of Albania, married Voisava Balsha
2. Gjergj I Thopia

== Family tree ==
Ancestors of Hélène of Anjou

16. Louis VIII of France
8. Charles I of Anjou
17. Blanche of Castile
4. Charles II of Naples
18. Ramon Berenguer V, Count of Provence
9. Beatrice of Provence
19. Beatrice of Savoy
2. Robert, King of Naples
20. Béla IV of Hungary
10. Stephen V of Hungary
21. Maria Laskarina
5. Mary of Hungary, Queen of Naples
22. Köten
11. Elizabeth the Cuman
1. Hélène of Anjou
6. Unknown
3. Unknown
7. Unknown

== See also ==
- Capetian House of Anjou
- Thopia family
- Kingdom of Naples
- Principality of Albania (medieval)

== Notes ==
1. Her birth year is uncertain due to the lack of detailed records. However, based on the known dates of her father's life (born 1276) and the ages of her siblings, such as Charles, Duke of Calabria (born 1298), Louis of Anjou (born 1301), and Charles d'Artois (born c. 1300s), it is estimated that she was born around the early 1300s.
2. Sources conflict on the name of Hélène's husband, with some identifying him as Andrea I Thopia and others as Tanush Thopia. However, it is recorded that her marriage took place in 1338.

== Bibliography ==
- Elsie, Robert (2003). Early Albania A Reader of Historical Texts, 11th-17th Centuries. Harrassowitz. ISBN 978-3-4470-4783-8.
- Ersch, Johann Samuel (1868). Allgemeine Encyclopädie der Wissenschaften und Künste in alphabetischer Folge von genannten Schriftstellern Erste Section A - G ; Griechenland [General Encyclopedia of the Sciences and Arts in alphabetical order by named authors First Section A-G; Greece] (in German). Brockhaus.
- Fine, John V. A. (1994). The Late Medieval Balkans: A Critical Survey from the Late Twelfth Century to the Ottoman Conquest. University of Michigan Press. ISBN 978-0-4720-8260-5.
- Hopf, Karl (1873). Chroniques greco-romanes inedites ou peu connues [Unpublished or little-known Greco-Roman chronicles] (in French). Weidmann.
- Jacques, Edwin E. (2009). The Albanians: An Ethnic History from Prehistoric Times to the Present - Volume 1. McFarland & Company. ISBN 978-0-8995-0932-7.
- Sainty, Guy Stair (2018). The Constantinian Order of Saint George and the Angeli, Farnese and Bourbon families which governed it. Boletín Oficial del Estado. ISBN 978-8-4340-2506-6.
- Šufflay, Milan (2012). Serbs and Albanians Their Symbiosis in the Middle Ages. GPX Alerion LLC. ISBN 978-0-9887-1292-8.
- Zavalani, Tajar (2015). History of Albania. Centre for Albanian Studies. ISBN 978-1-5075-9567-1.
