= Raymond Berengar of Andria =

- Count of Andria
- Born: c. 1280
- Died: 1307
- Spouse: Margaret of Clermont
- House: House of Anjou-Sicily
- Father: Charles II of Naples
- Mother: Mary of Hungary

Raymond Berengar of Anjou (between 1279 and 1282 – 1307) was the count of Andria and possibly Count of Provence and Prince of Piedmont.

Raymond Berengar was the fifth son of King Charles II of Naples and Mary of Hungary. He was born in Provence during a brief return of his father to take command of a fleet there. His homeland is evidenced in his Provençal name and the name of his nurse, Adelasia of Aix-en-Provence. He was known to have been born after his brother Robert the Wise and no document of time places him in Naples for many more years. Consequently, he spent his childhood under the guardianship of William de Manoir in the cities of Aix, Sisteron, St Victor, near Marseille, and Barjols. It is from Sisteron that a letter was sent, dated 2 May 1286, by him and his two elder brothers, Robert and Saint Louis of Toulouse, asking King Edward I of England for the release of their captive father.

By the Treaty of Canfranc (29 October 1288), he was given as a hostage, along with his elder brothers, in exchange for his father. He was ill at the time and did not get sent to Catalonia until the next year (23 February 1289). He joined his brothers at Moncada on 9 March. The three princes were treated with the honour due their status and they carried an entourage of a hundred young noblemen. Raymond invited Pierre de Jean-Olieu to visit him in prison, but received only a letter of consolation. The brothers were finally released on 7 June 1295 in accordance with the stipulations of the Treaty of Anagni.

Upon his release, he travelled to Naples and visited the Castel dell'Ovo. He followed his brother Louis to Rome. He returned to there in 1297 with his brothers Philip and John to receive Yolanda, daughter of Peter III of Aragon, and bride of Robert their brother, and escort her on to Naples.

In December 1300, Raymond received the honours of Monte Sant'Angelo, Capaccio, Eboli, Isernia, Atri and Vieste, and Altamura, the counties of Gravina and Andria, and the castellanies of Vairano, Lesina, and Terra di Muro. In 1302, he lost Gravina. On 13 December 1304, he was invested with the Countship of Piedmont. Piedmont appears as his brother's in 1307, so his possession of this fief was probably theoretical and not actual. A little later he was created Vicar General of the Regno and in August 1305 grand seneschal.

Raymond Berengar's participation in the politics of the Regno was limited. He fought the Aragonese in Sicily in 1301 and did initiate a grant of land near Gravina to the Knights Templar. In July 1304, he again went to Rome to receive a wife for his brother Robert. This time it was Sancha, daughter of James II of Majorca. He died shortly after his own marriage to Margaret, daughter of Robert, Count of Clermont.

== Sources ==
- Bruzelius, Caroline Astrid (2004). The Stones of Naples: Church Building in Angevin Italy, 1266-1343. Yale University Press.
- Dunbabin, Jean (2011). The French in the Kingdom of Sicily, 1266–1305. Cambridge University Press.
- Ghisalberti, Alberto M. Dizionario Biografico degli Italiani: III Ammirato – Arcoleo. Rome, 1961.
