= Sancho of Majorca =

Sancho
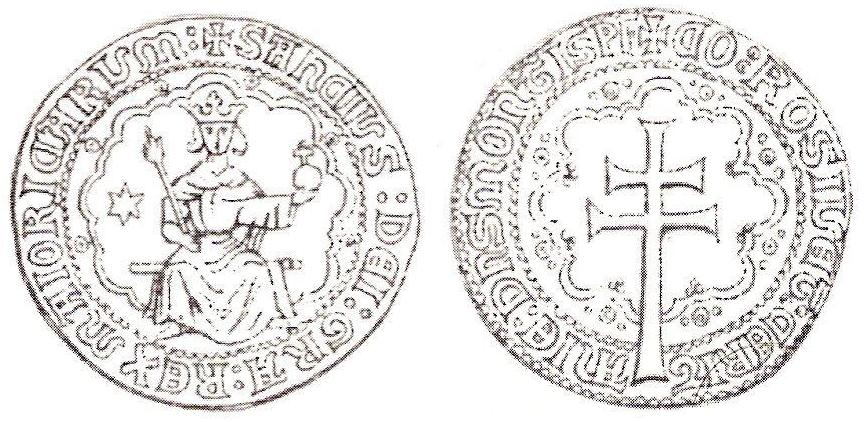

King of Majorca
- Reign: 29 May 1311 – 4 September 1324
- Predecessor: James II
- Successor: James III
- Born: c. 1277; Pina, Mallorca
- Died: 4 September 1324 (aged 49–50); Formiguères
- Burial: Cathedral of Perpignan
- Spouse: Maria of Naples
- House: House of Barcelona
- Father: James II of Majorca
- Mother: Esclaramunda of Foix
- Religion: Roman Catholicism

Sancho (Catalan: Sanç; c. 1277 – 4 September 1324), called the Pacific or the Peaceful, was King of Majorca, Count of Roussillon and Cerdanya, and Lord of Montpellier from 1311 to his death. His 13-year-long reign was markedly undisturbed by turmoil, which earned him his epithets, and is thus often contrasted to the troublesome reigns of his father, James II, and nephew, James III, his predecessor and successor respectively.

== Youth ==
Sancho was one of five children and the second son of James II and Esclaramunda of Foix. He was born in Pina, Mallorca around 1277. His father ruled the Kingdom of Majorca and adjacent fiefs under the suzerainty of his brother and afterwards nephews, the kings of Aragon. James's attempts to free himself of this vassalage led to his deposition by his nephew, King Alfonso III of Aragon, in 1286. Sancho, his mother and his elder brother, James, were taken captives by their cousin. The Queen was released but the brothers were kept in close confinement for several years, sometimes in irons. The Treaty of Anagni in 1295 secured their release by King James II of Aragon as well as the return of the Balearic Islands to their father. Following the release, the princes were sent to the French royal court in Paris for education.

Sancho's family was noted for its religious zeal. When in 1299 his elder brother, James, renounced his right to the throne to become a Franciscan, Sancho became heir apparent to his father's dominions. He was officially recognized as such in 1302 despite his poor health, for the alternative was his younger brother Ferdinand, with whom their father was at odds.

== Personal life ==
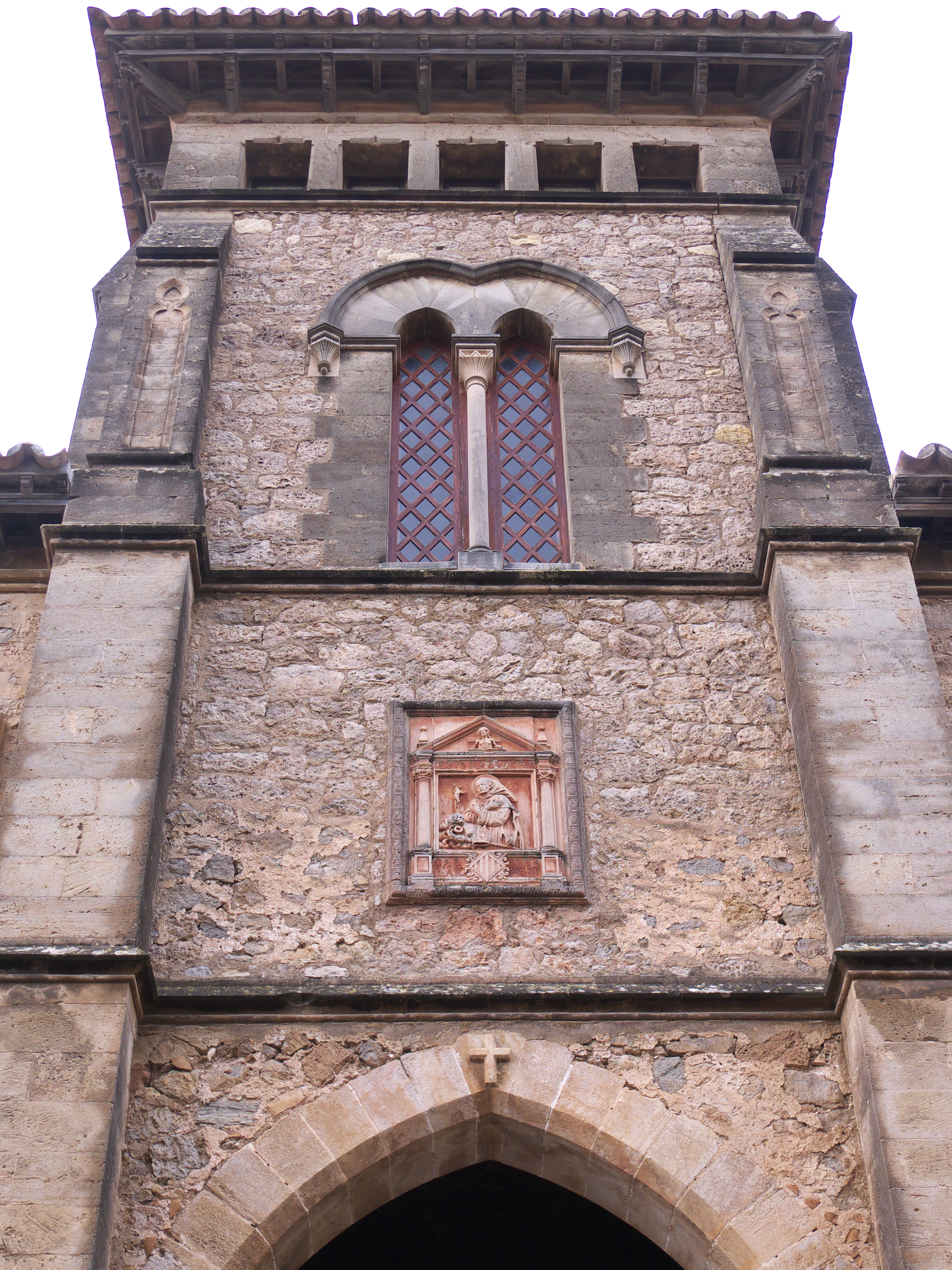
A tower at King Sancho's palace in Valldemossa

A proxy marriage with Maria, daughter of King Charles II of Naples, took place in September 1304, only three months after Sancho's sister Sancha married Maria's brother Robert. Sancho and Maria married in person five years later. The unions were part of a large-scale effort to achieve peace between the House of Barcelona, which ruled the kingdoms of Aragon, Majorca and Sicily, and the Capetian House of Anjou, which ruled the Kingdom of Naples. Sancho's union with Maria was suggested by his cousin James II of Aragon, who was already married to Maria's sister Blanche. Yet another sister-in-law of Sancho, Eleanor, married his cousin (James II of Aragon's brother) Frederick III of Sicily.

Sancho was of delicate constitution and prone to asthma, prompting him to spend much of his time enjoying fresh air in the uplands. He thus established his residence in Valldemossa; the Valldemossa Charterhouse was later built on the site of Sancho's palace. The King also loved sports; he introduced partridges to the islands and passed severe anti-poaching laws. Pious but nevertheless notoriously lecherous, Sancho had three mistresses and at least four illegitimate daughters and an illegitimate son who entered a religious order.

== Reign ==
Sancho became king upon James II's death on 29 May 1311. In his early reign, Sancho struggled to continue his father's policy of stabilising the kingdom, but the major city of the realm, Palma de Mallorca, fought for autonomy. The relations with Aragon were for the most part cordial throughout his reign. He was quick to answer James II of Aragon's call to Corts and assist him in the conquest of Sardinia. At the Corts, he swore fealty to his cousin in full view of the assembled legislators, which assured James so much that he absolved Sancho from obligations to attend his future Corts.

Sancho extorted money from the realm's Jewish population in order to build a powerful navy that would rival that of the maritime republics of Genoa and Venice, but his grandiose plans came to nothing. The King's attitude towards his Jewish subjects changed throughout his reign. He was infuriated in 1315 by the scandalous conversion of two German Christians to Judaism on the island, and responded by severely fining the Jews and confiscating all their property, including the synagogue. He also deprived them of all "privileges, liberties and immunities" granted by himself and his predecessors. He later allowed Jews to build a new synagogue, for which they had no resources, and in 1323 rewarded them financially for helping the royal treasury and for helping the construction of the Cathedral of Perpignan.

== Succession issues and death ==
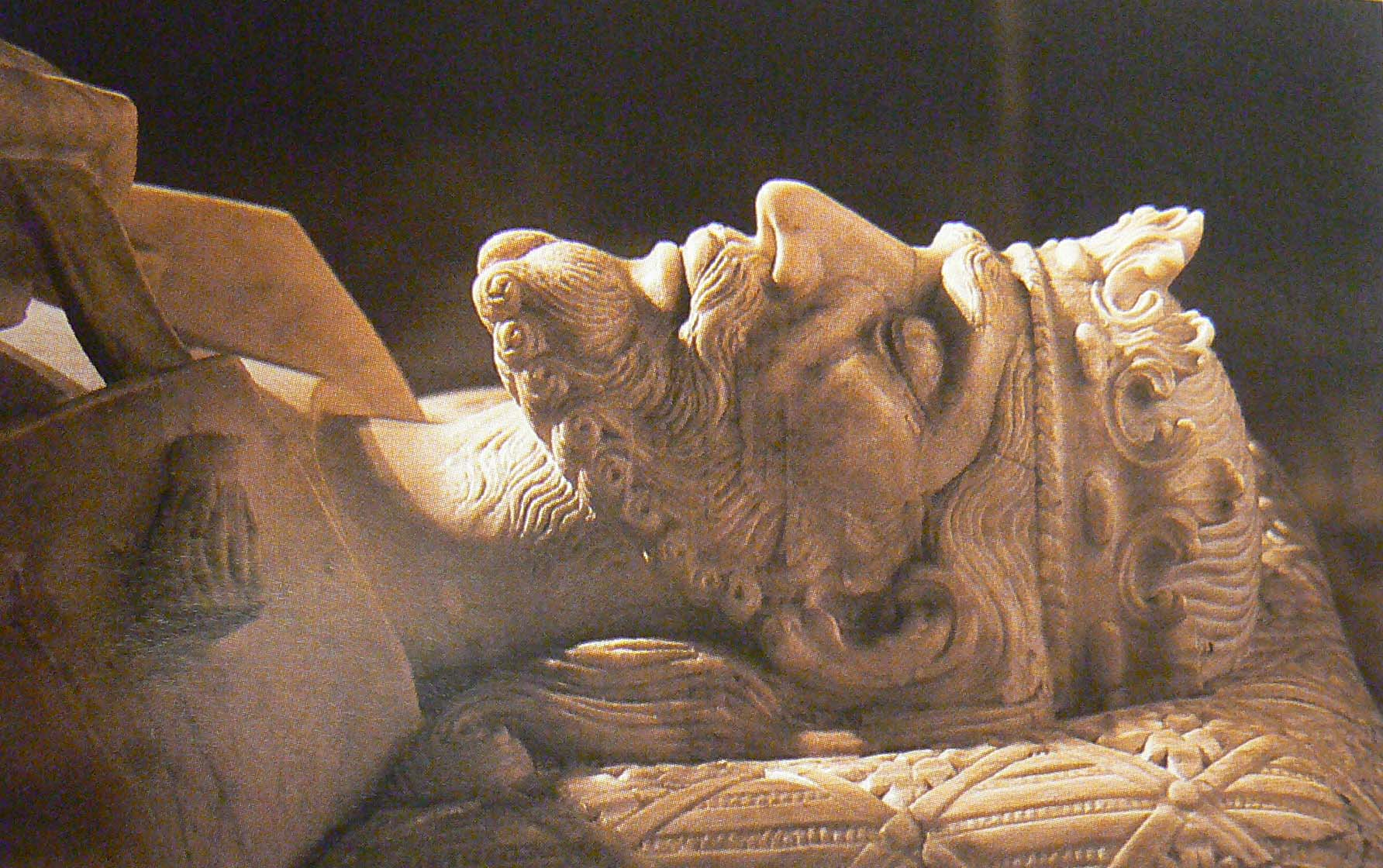
Detail from Sancho's tomb in the Cathedral of Perpignan, by Frederic Marès

King Sancho's marriage was childless, which proved problematic in terms of succession. James II of Aragon claimed that the crown should revert to him if Sancho were to die leaving no legitimate issue, but Sancho himself was eager to prevent that. The elder of his two brothers, Ferdinand, had predeceased him; the younger, Philip, had also chosen an ecclesiastical career. Ferdinand, however, had left two sons, James and Ferdinand, and in 1322 Sancho devised a will detailing the line of succession: should Sancho have no legitimate children, the crown was to pass to James, then to the younger Ferdinand, and only if both boys were to die childless to the King of Aragon. He then proceeded to prepare the realm for his underage nephew's accession by establishing a regency council consisting of six people, three from the Kingdom of Majorca and three from the counties of Roussillon and Cerdagne. War almost broke out with the enraged King of Aragon, but Sancho had the support of King Charles IV of France.

In the summer of 1324, the asthmatic Sancho sought to escape the heat of his kingdom by spending the season in Formiguères. The precaution was futile, however. He died of an asthma attack on 4 September 1324. His nephew, James III, succeeded him. The arrival of Sancho's funeral procession on 11 September caused a tumult in Perpignan, with the townspeople attacking the nobles who accompanied his corpse and seizing the King's remains. The remains are now interred in the newly built Cathedral of Perpignan, which Sancho himself had chosen for his burial.

== Family tree ==
James I of Aragon
Peter III of Aragon | James II of Majorca
Alfonso III of Aragon | James II of Aragon, I of Sicily | Frederick III of Sicily | James of Majorca | Sancho of Majorca | Ferdinand of Majorca | Philip of Majorca
James III of Majorca

Sancho of Majorca House of Barcelona Born: c. 1274 Died: 4 September 1324
Regnal titles
| Preceded by James II | King of Majorca; Count of Roussillon and Cerdagne; Lord of Montpellier; 1311–1324 | Succeeded by James III |
