= James of Majorca =

James of Majorca may refer to:

- James of Majorca (monk)
- James I of Majorca
- James II of Majorca
- James III of Majorca
- James IV of Majorca
