= Philip of Majorca =

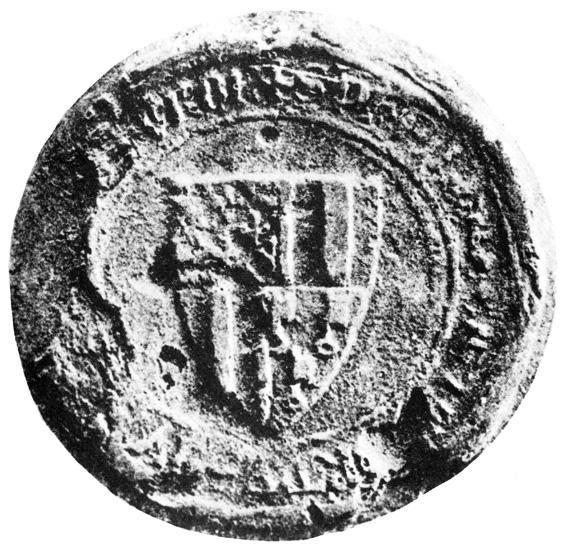
Philip's seal as treasurer of Tours

Philip of Majorca (Catalan: Felip; 1288–1343) was an infante and a Franciscan who served as regent of the Kingdom of Majorca between 1324 and 1329. Both as a theologian and as regent, Philip was a noted supporter of the Beguines and Spiritual Franciscans, preaching poverty for all clerics. He spent a large part of his career unsuccessfully trying to establish a new Franciscan-based religious order.

== Early life ==
Philip was the youngest of the four sons of King James II of Majorca and Esclaramunda of Foix. He was born into the exceptionally devout Roman Catholic House of Barcelona: his grandfather King James I resigned his crowns to become a Cistercian monk, his eldest brother James renounced his succession rights and joined the Franciscan order, and his sister Sancha's desire to enter a religious order prompted her to seek a dissolution of her marriage to King Robert of Naples. Felipe was sent to Paris to receive a political education, in which he would accompany his brother Sancho.

== Career ==
While studying in Paris, Philip decided to join the Dominican Order. In 1308, Philip accompanied his aging father to Avignon to discuss political matters with the curia. While in Avignon Philip met Angelo da Clareno (possibly Ubertino of Casale as well), and was invited to participate in debates the debates over Spiritualism with influential members of the Fraticelli. These debates began in 1308, when Pope Clement called for a group of Franciscan theologians to discuss unregulated religious orders. Philip proved to impress Angelo da Clareno, and maintained close contact with the Fraticelli leader in the following years.

From 1311–1312, Philip hosted Clareno in Perpignan under his protectorship, as the friar became a target of religious persecution. These connections drove his decision towards joining the Spiritual Franciscans as his desire for austerity and sympathy for the Beguines made him better suited to the Franciscan Third Order. He supported the groups campaign to impose poverty on all clerics, regardless of status, even after Pope John XXII denounced them as heretics in 1316. Philip was considered by the dissident order as devout, honorable, and devoted to a life of baseness. Clareno in a letter to his followers compared the young prince directly to Jesus Christ, and St. Francis of Assisi.Following his studies, Philip became treasurer of Tours Cathedral, and later held certain canonries. He refused the offer of the Archbishopric of Tarragona, which his kinsman King James II of Aragon wanted for his son John.

Philip developed a great admiration for the fellow Spiritual Franciscan Angelo da Clareno, who in turn became an admirer of Philip. The infante believed that the rules of the order should be practiced as strictly as possible, and surrounded himself with like-minded clergy and laity. Thanks to Philip, Majorca became a haven to the Beguine Spirituals persecuted as heretics in the south of France. He was, however, unable to provide them long-term protection, and they eventually came to feel betrayed by him, even identifying him as the Antichrist. Encouraged by Angelo da Clareno in the summers of 1316 and 1317, Philip began musing about founding a new religious order based on the rule of Saint Francis. He requested repeatedly and resolutely, but ultimately unsuccessfully, that Pope John XXII formally recognize the "Brothers of the Poor Life" – the group led by him and his friend. The Pope attempted to appease Philip and bring him under papal control by offering him the newly-created Bishopric of Mirepoix; Philip refused this see too. During this period Philip served as a valuable courtier to his brother Sancho.

== Regency ==
When King Sancho, Philip's elder brother, died in 1324, the crown of Majorca passed to the underage King James III, the son of Philip and Sancho's deceased brother Ferdinand. The succession was disputed, however, by James II of Aragon, who claimed that a clause in their grandfather's will stipulated that the crown of Majorca would pass to the king of Aragon should the king of Majorca have no sons. Denying this, Sancho had provided for a regency council, consisting of three citizens of Majorca, to rule in his nephew's name. The council soon found itself sharing authority with Philip, who lacked experience in politics and intrigue. Nevertheless, within a year of his nephew's contested accession, Philip managed to persuade the King of Aragon to drop his pretensions, receiving the renunciation signed and sealed. At the same time, he brokered a betrothal between the ten-year-old King of Majorca and the King of Aragon's five-year-old daughter Constance.

During his rule, Philip granted concessions to the kingdom's Jewish population. He resisted the Inquisition's pursuit of Spirituals, and strove to shield Jews from growing fanaticism. The regency was not particularly successful altogether, however. Philip encouraged immigration from religiously persecuted groups like the Beguines and Spirituals to Majorca, offering protection from the inquisition. Philip's lack of strength and "monkish virtues" put him at odds with the small state's communes and feudatories. The young king also grew to heartily resent his uncle, who assigned the guardianship over the boy to his favourite Adhémar de Mosset. Upon taking the reins of government into his own hands in 1329, the not-so-pious James III had his former guardian tried for heresy.

== Last years ==
No longer involved in state affairs, Philip left Majorca and moved to the Neapolitan court of his sister and brother-in-law, where he spent the rest of his life. The Kingdom's queen, Sancia of Majorca, already hosted many Spirituals who held powerful court positions. Soon after arriving to Naples, he renounced all his benefices. The queen hosted Philip's entourage in the Castel Nuovo, and they became acquainted with the spiritual leaders Andreas de Gagliano and Robert of Mileto. A rumor emerged from Naples that Philip was a candidate to replace Pope John XXIII, that is further corroborated by Sancia and Robert of Naples vocal advocation for his ascent to the position. Encouraged by the subtle hostility of King Robert's court towards the papacy, Philip openly attacked Pope John XXII in a sermon, asserting that, papal decrees notwithstanding, the existence of the "Brothers of the poor Life" was the realization of the Gospel. He attempted to establish the order once more, but Pope Benedict XII confirmed his predecessor's decision. In 1337, Philip's long-time friend and mentor Angelo da Clareno died and Philip worked with leaders amongst the Spirituals to collect his letters and works. Philip died in 1344 in the Kingdom of Naples and his sister and protector Sancia died soon after.
