= Charles of Artois =

Charles of Artois may refer to:

- Charles of Artois, Count of Eu (1394–1472)
- Charles of Artois, Count of Pézenas (1328–1385)

== See also ==
- Charles d'Artois (1300–1346), Neapolitan nobleman and court official
