= Mary of Anjou =

Mary of Anjou may refer to:

- Marie of Anjou (1404–1463), queen consort of France
- Maria of Anjou (1371–1395), queen regnant of Hungary and Croatia
- Maria of Anjou, Queen of Majorca (1290–1346/47), queen consort of Majorca
- Maria of Calabria (1328–1366), titular empress of Latin Empire of Constantinople
