= James of Majorca (monk) =

James of Majorca (Catalan: Jaume; before 1274 – c. 1330) was a member of the House of Barcelona and of the Order of Friars Minor.

James was the eldest of the four sons of James II and Esclaramunda of Foix, King and Queen of Majorca. As such, he was heir apparent to the throne of the Kingdom of Majorca. The family was exceptionally devout even by the standards of the era: his grandfather James I stepped down to join the Cistercians, while both his brother Philip and sister Sancia were noted for their close ties to the Order of Saint Francis. James himself probably became acquainted with the Franciscans alongside another prince of the same age, Louis of Naples, while the latter was held hostage in Barcelona by King James II of Aragon, the Majorcan prince's first cousin. At one point, the King is known to have issued a "note prohibiting the friars from visiting the princes at night", indicating their close relationship with each other and with the Franciscans. Louis renounced his position as heir apparent to the throne of Naples and became Bishop of Toulouse in 1297 (and was eventually canonized), dying the same year, which probably left an impression on James.

James was set to marry Catherine de Courtenay, the heiress of the defunct Latin Empire. The betrothal was celebrated in 1298 in the presence of the entire French royal court, including King Philip IV and Queen Joan I. Since the couple were too closely related, the condition for the marriage was dispensation from Pope Boniface VIII. It was never granted. Instead, James decided to remove himself from the line of succession in favour of his brother Sancho and take the habit. In 1299, in the words of his sister Sancia, James "renounced royal power for the love of Jesus Christ and became a son of Blessed Francis and entered his order". He spent the rest of his life in the Minorite convent at Perpignan as a simple friar.

== See also ==
- James of Aragon (monk)
