= Kingdom of Majorca =

State on the eastern coast and islands of the Iberian Peninsula from 1276 to 1715

Kingdom of Majorca Regne de Mallorca (Catalan) Reino de Mallorca (Spanish) Regnum Maioricae (Latin) Royaume de Majorque (French)
- 1276–1715
- Flag Coat of arms

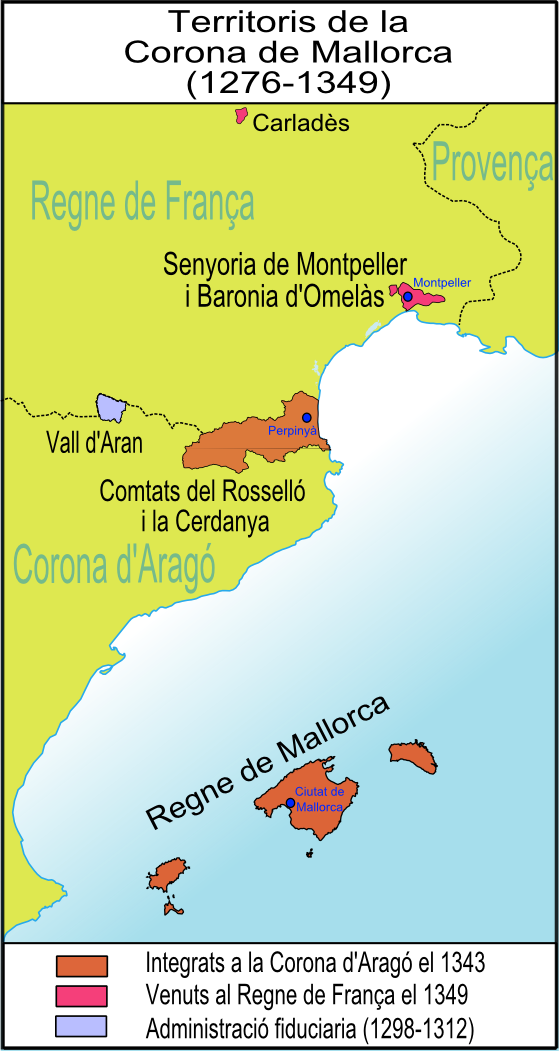
- The Kingdom of Majorca in the 13th and 14th centuries
- Status: Vassal state of the Crown of Aragon (until 1344); Part of the Crown of Aragon (1344–1715)
- Capital: Palma and Perpignan
- Common languages: Catalan
- Religion: Roman Catholicism (official); Islam; Judaism
- Government: Constitutional monarchy
- History
  - Established: 1276
  - Nueva Planta decrees: 1715
Preceded by	Succeeded by
Crown of Aragon	Kingdom of Spain
- Today part of: Spain; France

The Kingdom of Majorca was an insular realm off the east coast of modern day Spain, which included the islands of Mallorca, Menorca, Ibiza and Formentera. The islands were conquered from the Almohad Caliphate by James I of Aragon, and were integrated in the Crown of Aragon. The king became known as James the Conqueror due to the Conquest of Majorca.

When James I died in 1276, he divided his territories between his three surviving sons. Peter, the eldest, succeeded his father in the mainland as Peter III of Aragon or Peter the Great. The Kingdom of Majorca passed to the younger son James, who reigned as James II of Majorca.

After 1279, Peter III of Aragon decreed that the King of Majorca was to be a vassal of the King of Aragon. Naturally, this led to conflict between the two brothers. Finally, in 1344, the Kingdom of Mallorca was invaded by King Peter IV of Aragon and brought under the Crown of Aragon. It remained a separate Kingdom, but with the same King, until its dissolution in 1715 by the Nueva Planta decrees.

== History ==
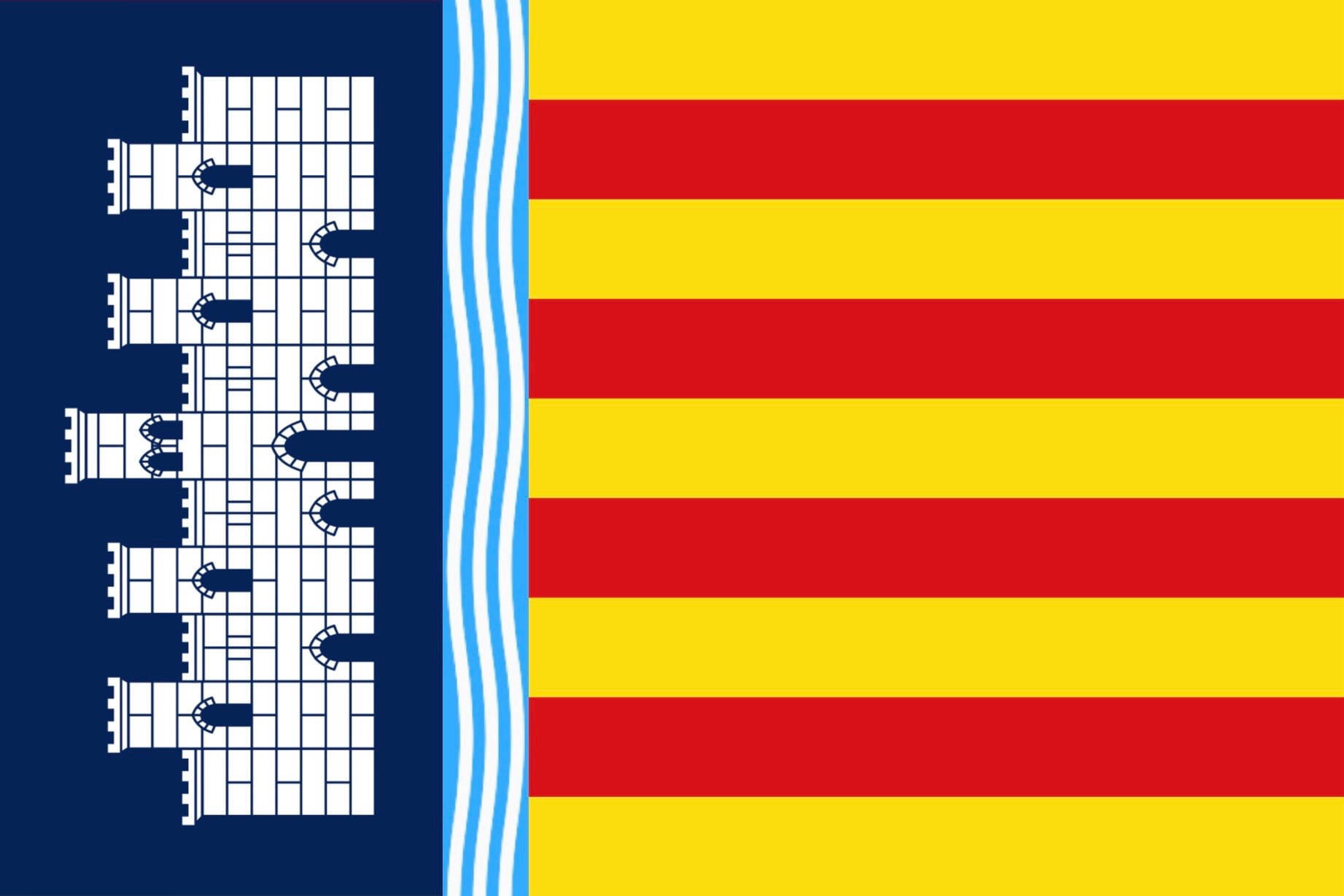
Flag of the Kingdom of Majorca in 1269 by James I

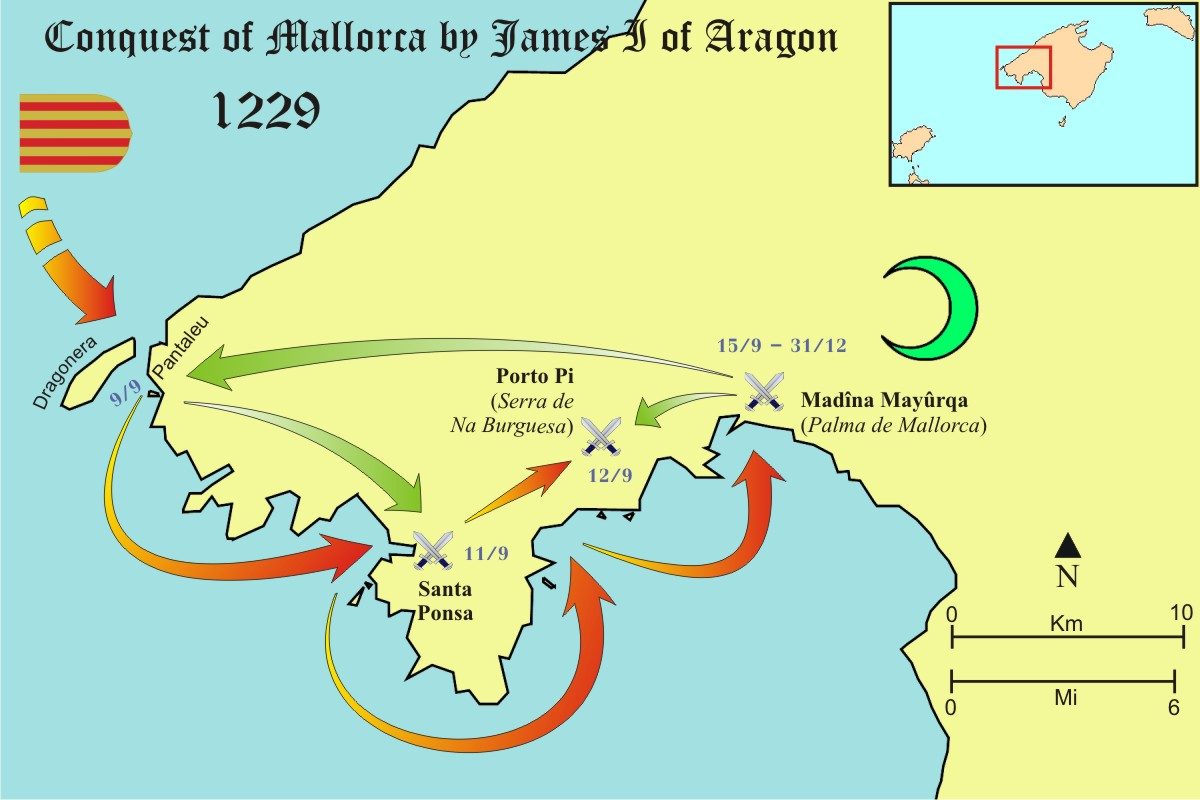
Conquest of Majorca by James I of Aragon (1229)

The legacy of James I included the creation of a strategic Mediterranean enclave, including territories between two large kingdoms, the Capetians of France and the Crown of Aragon, which were in constant conflict at the time. Conscious of the fragility of the Kingdom of Majorca, James I undertook the conquest of Cerdanya to unify the new kingdom. He also entered into negotiations to arrange the marriage of his son James to Beatrice of Savoy, daughter of Amadeus IV, Count of Savoy. Neither plan was successful.

The King of Majorca, James II initially tried to remain independent of the Aragonese crown. The weakness of the Majorcan state, lacking any parliament or other unifying institutions, however, brought it close to collapse. In 1279, the Majorcan monarch reconciled and recognized the King of Aragon as his overlord. The resulting Treaty of Perpignan re-established the centralised state that existed before the death of James I.

At this point, James II of Majorca found himself in the awkward position of opposing his overlord, having allied himself with Pope Martin IV and the French. Alfonso, son of the Aragonese king, invaded the realm of his uncle and conquered the island of Mallorca in 1286. Some 10 years later, a new treaty - the Treaty of Anagni - ordered the return of the islands to King James II of Majorca.

In 1289, Alfonso III established the Military Order of the Collar, with the sole purpose of defending the Kingdom of Majorca. This later became an chivalric knighthood of the Royal House of Aragon.

On the death of James II in 1324, his son Sancho succeeded him. Relations between Aragon and Majorca were strained: despite the Treaty of Anagni, the descendants of Alfonso had not renounced their claim to the Majorcan throne. In 1325, deep in debt from his invasion of Sardinia, Sancho agreed to appoint the kings of Aragon as his heirs to the crown of Majorca.

While this act may have solved the problem of succession, the kingdom was plunged into a severe financial crisis. Majorca was forced to develop policies similar to those of Aragon. The war against the Republic of Genoa (1329–1336) resulted in the loss of various overseas markets. It was necessary to impose new taxes and fines, which were levied on the Jewish community; despite this, the financial crisis continued.

In 1341, Peter IV of Aragon broke off relations with the Kingdom of Majorca as a prelude to invasion. In May 1343, Peter IV invaded the Balearic Islands and followed that in 1344 with the invasions of the counties of Roussillon and Cerdanya. James III of Majorca was left with only his French possessions. Selling these to the King of France, in 1349 James III set out to reconquer his kingdom. He was defeated and killed at the Battle of Llucmajor on 25 October 1349. From then on, the Kingdom of Majorca remained in personal union with the Crown of Aragon.

=== Fall of Majorca ===
The extinction of the Kingdom of Majorca was inevitable given the conflicts by which it was affected: the Hundred Years War between France and England; the War with the Benimerines, which involved Castile and the Crown of Aragon as well as attempts by the Genoese to make the Balearics a satellite state. The Kingdom of Majorca, which had bonds of vassalage with the crowns of France (through Montpellier) and Aragon, could not remain neutral during the conflicts. In addition, increased taxes to fund the kingdom's treasury during its neutrality caused substantial unrest.

The Kingdom of Majorca continued for nearly another four hundred years in personal union with the Crown of Aragon, retaining its own viceroy and political identity. However, during the War of the Spanish Succession the Crown of Aragon mostly backed the claims of the Archduke Charles and with his defeat the victorious Philip V of Spain abolished the kingdom via the Nueva Planta decrees in 1715.

== Geography ==
The kingdom included the Balearic Islands: Mallorca, Menorca, Ibiza and Formentera. The king was also lord of the mainland counties of Roussillon and Cerdanya, and the territories James I kept in Occitania: the signory of Montpellier, the viscountcy of Carlat in Auvergne, and the barony of Aumelas, contiguous with Montpellier.

== Monarchs of Majorca ==
Pretender	Portrait	Birth	Marriages	Death
James I 1231–1276	James I	2 February 1208; Montpellier son of Peter II of Aragon and Marie of Montpellier	Eleanor; 1221; 1 child Violant of Hungary; 1235; 10 children Teresa Gil de Vidaure; 2 children	27 July 1276; Valencia aged 68
James II; 1276–1286 (first rule)	James I	1243; Montpellier son of James I of Aragon and Violant of Hungary	Esclaramunda of Foix; 1275; 6 children	1311; Palma de Mallorca aged 68
Alfonso I Alfonso III of Aragon; 1286–1291	Peter III	1265; Valencia son of Peter III of Aragon and Constance of Sicily	unmarried	18 June 1291; Barcelona aged 27
James III; James II of Aragon; 1291–1295		10 August 1267; Valencia son of Peter III and Constance of Sicily	Isabella of Castile; 1 December 1291; No children Blanche of Anjou; 29 October 1295; 10 children Marie de Lusignan; 15 June 1315; No children Elisenda de Montcada; 25 December 1322; No children	5 November 1327; Barcelona aged 60
James II; 1295–1311 (second rule)	James I	1243; Montpellier son of James I of Aragon and Violant of Hungary	Esclaramunda of Foix; 1275; 6 children	1311; Palma de Mallorca aged 68
Sancho; 1311–1324	Majorca	c. 1277 son of James II of Majorca and Esclaramunda of Foix	Maria of Naples; 20 September 1304; No children	4 September 1324; Formiguera aged 48
James III; 1324–1344		5 April 1315; Catania son of Ferdinand of Majorca and Isabelle of Sabran	Constance of Aragon; 2 children Violant of Vilaragut; 10 November 1347; 1 child	25 October 1349; Llucmajor aged 34

=== Pretenders to the throne ===
Peter IV of Aragon annexed the kingdom in 1344 and the title was part of the Crown of Aragon, though disputed by pretenders.

Pretender	Portrait	Birth	Marriages	Death
James IV; 1349–1375		1335; Montpellier son of James III of Majorca and Constance of Aragon	Joan I of Naples; 26 September 1363; No children	20 January 1375; Soria aged 40
Isabella; 1375–1406	Majorca	1337 daughter of James III of Majorca and Constance of Aragon	John II of Montferrat; 4 September 1358; 5 children Konrad of Reischach; 1375; 1 child	1406; France aged 69

Isabel's descendants did not continue the pretension.
