= Constance II of Sicily =

Queen of Sicily from 1282 to 1285

Constance II
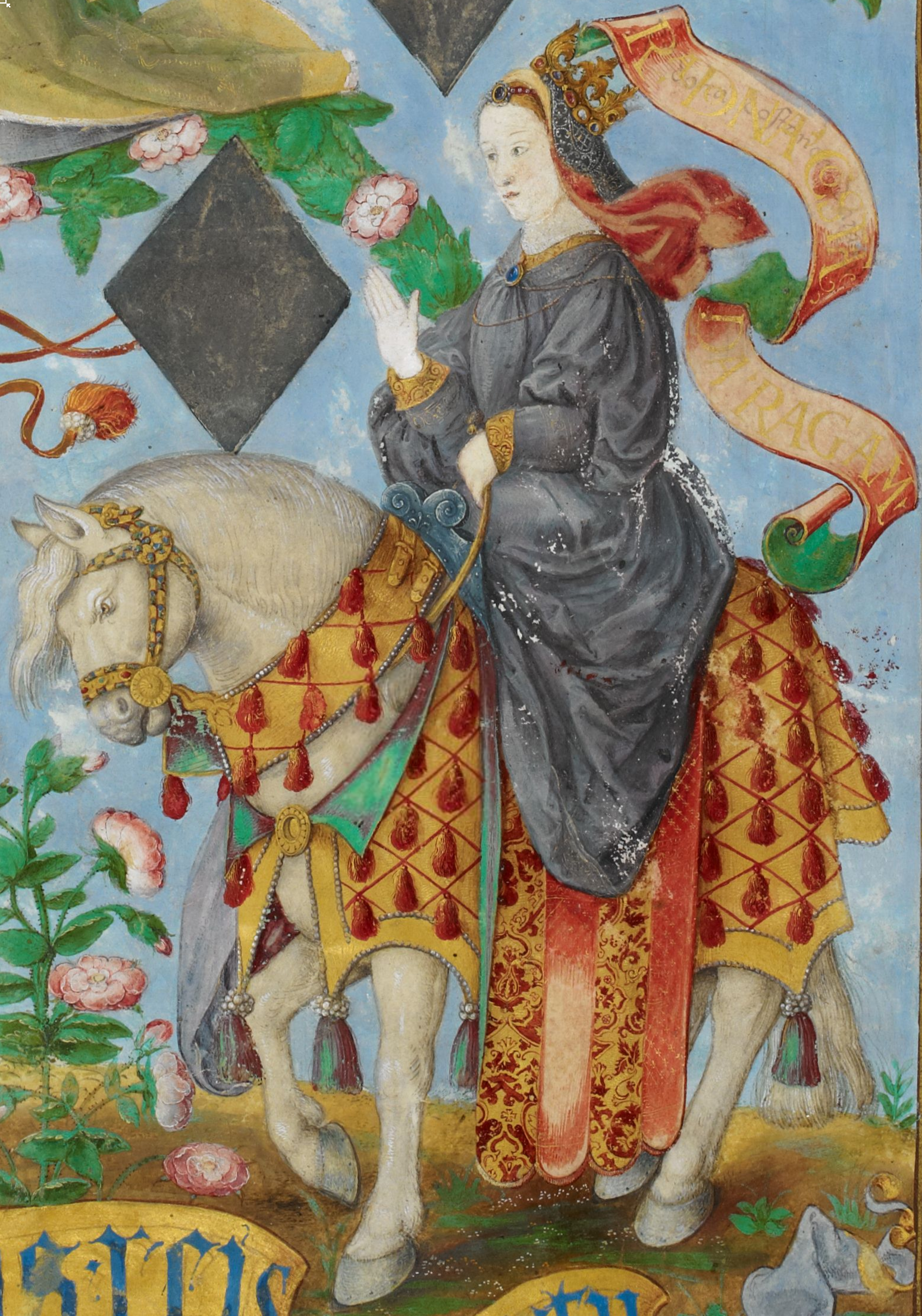

Queen of Sicily
- Reign: 1282–1285 (also pretender from 1268)
- Predecessor: Conradin (as pretender) or Charles I (de facto)
- Successor: James I
- Co-ruler: Peter I

Queen consort of Aragon
- Tenure: 27 July 1276 – November 1285
- Born: c. 1249; Kingdom of Sicily
- Died: 9 April 1302 (aged 52–53); Barcelona, Crown of Aragon
- Burial: Barcelona Cathedral
- Spouse: Peter III of Aragon (m. 1262; died 1285)
- Issue: Alfonso III, King of Aragon; James II, King of Aragon; Elizabeth, Queen of Portugal; Frederick III, King of Sicily; Yolande, Duchess of Calabria; Peter of Aragon
- House: Hohenstaufen
- Father: Manfred, King of Sicily
- Mother: Beatrice of Savoy

Arms of Constance II of Sicily

Constance II (in Italian: Costanza; in Catalan: Constança; c. 1249 – 9 April 1302) was queen regnant of Sicily from September 1282 to November 1285 alongside her husband, King Peter I. She was also queen consort of Aragon from 1276 to 1285. She was a pretender to the Kingdom of Sicily from 1268 to 1282. She was the only daughter of Manfred, King of Sicily, and his first wife, Beatrice of Savoy.

== Life ==
Constance was largely raised by Bella d'Amichi, who remained her favorite and confidante as queen. On 13 June 1262, Constance married Peter, eldest son of King James I of Aragon. Her father was killed in the Battle of Benevento (26 February 1266) while fighting against his rival, Charles I of Anjou. She inherited his claim to the Sicilian throne.

James I died on 27 July 1276 and Peter succeeded to the throne with Constance as queen. During the War of the Sicilian Vespers (1282–1302), Peter and then their sons claimed the throne of Sicily in her right. The war resulted in the partition of the Kingdom of Sicily and the creation of the Kingdom of Trinacria under her heirs and the Kingdom of Naples under the heirs of Charles of Anjou.

Peter III died on November 1285. Constance died as a nun in Barcelona.

== Children ==
Constance and Peter III of Aragon had six children:

- Alfonso III of Aragon (4 November 1265 – 18 June 1291).
- James II of Aragon (10 August 1267 – 2 November 1327).
- Elizabeth, Queen of Portugal (c. 1271 – 4 July 1336). Married Denis of Portugal
- Frederick III of Sicily (13 December 1272 – 25 June 1337).
- Yolande, Duchess of Calabria (c. 1273 – August 1302). Married Robert of Naples
- Peter of Aragon (c. 1275 – 25 August 1296). Married Guillemette of Béarn, daughter of Gaston VII, Viscount of Béarn.

== Role in Dante's Divine Comedy ==
Though most historical sources have little information about her, Constance occupies a place in Dante Alighieri's Divine Comedy. Constance's appearance in Canto III of Purgatorio of the Divine Comedy is understated and shadow-like. The reader learns of Constance through the speech of her father, Manfred of Sicily, whom Dante meets in the space of Mount Purgatory reserved for excommunicated souls. Manfred begs the poet to bring the truth "if another tale is told [to his] fair daughter, mother of the pride of Sicily and Aragon." Manfred proceeds to tell Dante of how he repented and confessed to God for his "horrible" sins shortly before his death, and was thus saved from an afterlife in Hell, contrary to what others may have thought. Manfred concludes his speech by telling Dante that his sentence in Purgatory may be lessened if those still alive on Earth pray for him, and subsequently by asking Dante to tell Constance of his current placement and of how her "holy prayers" can aid in his movement toward Paradise.

== Sources ==
- Bartlett, Robert (2020). Blood Royal: Dynastic Politics in Medieval Europe. Cambridge University Press.
- Burgtorf, Jochen (2007). "A Mediterranean Career in the Late Thirteenth Century: Hospitaller Grand Master Boniface of Calamandrana". In Borchardt, Karl; Jaspert, Nikolas; Nicholson, Helen J (eds.). The Hospitallers, the Mediterranean and Europe: Festschrift for Anthony Luttrell. Ashgate.
- Cawsey, Suzanne F. (2002). Kingship and Propaganda: Royal Eloquence and the Crown of Aragon c.1200-1450. Oxford University Press.
- George, Hereford Brooke (1875). Genealogical Tables Illustrative of Modern History. Oxford at the Clarendon Press.
- Lodge, Eleanor Constance (1924). The End of the Middle Age, 1273-1453. Methuen & Company Limited.
- Previte-Orton, C.W. (1960). The Shorter Cambridge Medieval History. Vol. II: The twelfth century to the Renaissance. Cambridge at the University Press.
- Runciman, Steven (1958). The Sicilian Vespers: A History of the Mediterranean World in the Later Thirteenth Century. Cambridge University Press.

Regnal titles
| Preceded by Charles I | Queen of Sicily; 1282–1285 with Peter I | Succeeded by James I |
Royal titles
| Preceded by Violant of Hungary | Queen consort of Aragon and Valencia; Countess consort of Barcelona; 1276–1285 | Succeeded by Isabella of Castile |
