= Isabella of Castile, Queen of Aragon =

Queen of Aragon from 1291 to 1295

Isabella of Castile
- Infanta of Castille
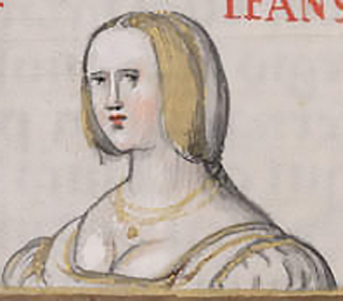

Queen consort of Aragon, Sicily, and Majorca
- Tenure: 1291–1295

Duchess consort of Brittany
- Tenure: 1312–1328
- Born: 1283; Toro, Crown of Castile
- Died: 24 July 1328 (aged 44–45); Billiers, Duchy of Brittany
- Burial: Prières Abbey
- Spouse: James II of Aragon; John III, Duke of Brittany
- House: Castilian House of Ivrea
- Father: Sancho IV of Castile
- Mother: María de Molina

Isabella of Castile (1283–24 July 1328) was the Queen of Aragon as the first wife of King James II and Duchess of Brittany as the second wife of Duke John III.

Isabella was born in Toro, the eldest daughter of King Sancho IV of Castile and María de Molina. As On 1 December 1291, Isabella married King James II of Aragon in the city of Soria. The bride was only 8 years old and the groom 24. The marriage was never consummated.

Sancho IV died on 25 April 1295. James chose to change his alliances and take advantage of the turmoil inside Castile. He had their wedding annulled and proceeded to marry Blanche of Anjou.

Isabella remained unwed for about a decade. In 1310, at Burgos, she married her second husband, Duke John III of Brittany. There were no children from this marriage. She died on 24 July 1328, and was buried at Prières Abbey.

== Sources ==
- Bent, Margaret (2016). Magister Jacobus de Ispania, Author of the Speculum musicae. Routledge.
- Burgtorf, Jochen (2008). The Central Convent of Hospitallers and Templars: History, Organization, and Personnel (1099/1120-1310). Brill. ISBN 978-90-04-16660-8.
- Martinez, H. Salvador (2010). Alfonso X, the Learned: A Biography. Translated by Cisneros, Odile. Brill. ISBN 978-90-04-18147-2.
- Mollat, G. (1907). "Le mausolée d'Isabelle de Castille, duchesse de Bretagne, à l'abbaye de Prières". Annales de Bretagne et des Pays de l'Ouest (in French). 23 (3): 394–396.
- Morvan, Frédéric (2009). La Chevalerie bretonne et la formation de l'armée ducale 1260-1341 (in French). Presses Universitaires de Rennes. ISBN 978-2-7535-0827-9.

Isabella of Castile, Queen of Aragon Castilian House of Burgundy Cadet branch of the Anscarids Born: circa 1283 Died: 24 July 1328
Royal titles
Vacant Title last held by Constance of Sicily	Queen consort of Aragon and Valencia; 1291–1295	Vacant Title next held by Blanche of Anjou
Vacant Title last held by Margaret of Burgundy	Queen consort of Sicily; 1291–1295	Vacant Title next held by Blanche of Anjou
Vacant Title last held by Esclaramunda of Foix	Queen consort of Majorca; 1291–1295	Vacant Title next held by Esclaramunda of Foix
Preceded by Yolande de Dreux	Duchess consort of Brittany; 1312–1328	Vacant Title next held by Joan of Savoy

--
