= Mary of Hungary, Queen of Naples =

Queen of Naples from 1285 to 1309

Mary of Hungary
- Queen consort of Naples; Queen consort of Albania
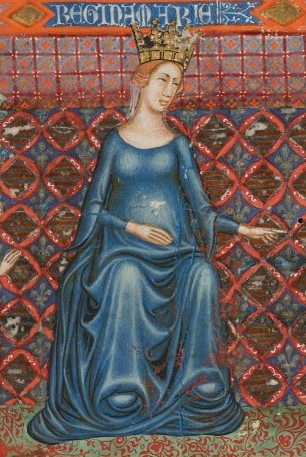
- Queen Mary from the Bible of Naples

Queen consort of Naples
- Tenure: 1285 – 5 May 1309

Queen consort of Albania
- Tenure: 7 January 1285 – 13 August 1294
- Predecessor: Margaret of Burgundy
- Successor: Thamar Angelina Komnene
- Born: 1257
- Died: 25 March 1323 (aged 65–66); Naples, Kingdom of Naples
- Burial: Santa Maria Donna Regina, Naples
- Spouse: Charles II of Naples
- Issue more...: Charles Martel, Prince of Salerno; Margaret, Countess of Anjou; Louis of Toulouse; Robert, King of Naples; Philip II, Latin Emperor; Blanche, Queen of Aragon; Raymond Berengar, Count of Andria; Eleanor, Queen of Sicily; Maria, Queen of Majorca; Peter, Count of Eboli; John, Duke of Durazzo
- Dynasty: Árpád
- Father: Stephen V of Hungary
- Mother: Elizabeth the Cuman

Mary of Hungary (c. 1257 – 25 March 1323), of the Árpád dynasty, was Queen of Naples and Queen of Albania by marriage to King Charles II. She was the daughter of Stephen V of Hungary and Elizabeth the Cuman. Mary served as regent in Provence in 1290–1294 and in Naples in 1295–1296, 1296–1298, and 1302, during the absences of her husband.

== Early life ==
Mary was the second of six children. Her sisters Elizabeth and Catherine both became Queen of Serbia. Another sister, Anna, married Andronikos II Palaiologos. Mary's only brother was Ladislaus IV of Hungary.

=== Marriage ===
Mary was 12 years old when she wed Charles II of Naples in Naples on 6 August 1270. The marriage was intended to be a double alliance between Naples and Hungary to support the intended conquest of Byzantium by Naples, but it did not serve its purpose as her brother in 1272 made an alliance with Byzantium as well. Maria accompanied Charles on his trips and spent 1278-82 in Provence with her consort. In 1284, she made her first political act: when Charles was taken captive by Aragon, she made the decision to free the Aragonese prisoner Beatrice of Hohenstaufen.

== Queen ==
In 1285, Charles became monarch but remained in an Aragonese prison. She did not take part in the regency for him in Naples, but remained in Provence, where she did take part in the administration from time to time, though she was not formal regent. In 1288, she took part in the negotiations of her consort's release, and the same year, she made a peace treaty with Aragon. Charles was released the same year, and they returned to Naples together.

In 1290-94, she was regent for him in Provence.

=== Struggle for the Hungarian throne ===
On 10 July 1290, Mary's brother, King Ladislaus IV of Hungary was murdered by three Cuman assassins,. Since Ladislaus had died childless, the question now was who would succeed him: in addition to Mary, her sisters Catherine and Elisabeth believed that they had claims, as did the children of the youngest sister, Anna. In addition, the crown was already claimed by Ladislaus' cousin Andrew the Venetian, who was the next heir according to agnatic descent. Andrew was summoned from Vienna by Archbishop Lodomer, who crowned him King Andrew III on 23 July with the Holy Crown of Hungary in Székesfehérvár, the traditional site for Hungarian coronations.

However, Mary refused to accept Andrew's right to the crown, because in her view his father Stephen the Posthumous had been a bastard, and thus not a legitimate member of the House of Árpád (the royal family of Hungary). Stephen had been born to the third wife of King Andrew II after her husband's death, and was not recognised by his elder half-brothers, including Mary's grandfather Béla IV. In April 1291, Mary declared her own claim to the throne. The Babonići, Frankopans, Šubići, and other leading Croatian and Slavonian noble families seemingly accepted her as the lawful monarch, although as events showed their loyalty in fact vacillated between her and Andrew III. In January 1292, she transferred her claim to Hungary to her son, the 18-year-old Charles Martel Charles was then set up by Pope Nicholas IV and the church party as the titular King of Hungary (1290–1295) as the successor of Mary's brother.

Andrew III was unable to give full attention to the conflict with Mary and Charles, because he was engaged in a conflict with another challenger, Albert of Austria. In the ensuing war, Andrew recovered from Albert several important towns and fortresses - including Pozsony (Bratislava) and Sopron - which had previously been held by the powerful Kőszegi family. After the Peace of Hainburg, which concluded the war, was signed on 26 August, the Kőszegis threw their support to Mary's party. They rose up in open rebellion against Andrew in spring 1292, acknowledging Charles Martel as King of Hungary. Andrew´s troops subdued the rebellion by July, but in August the Kőszegis captured and imprisoned him; he was freed only four months later.

During 1290, Mary's sister Elisabeth fled from Bohemia with her son because her husband had lost favour and was executed, Mary allowed Elisabeth and her son to stay in Naples with her, before she became a nun, but escaped and remarried to Stephen Uroš II Milutin of Serbia (brother of Catherine's husband).

Catherine's husband Stefan Dragutin, ruler of Syrmia, was allegedly willing to support Mary and her son Charles Martel. Charles Martel granted Slavonia to Dragutin's son, Vladislav, in 1292, but most Hungarian noblemen and prelates remained loyal to Andrew III. Dragutin also sought a reconciliation with Andrew, and Vladislav married Constance, the granddaughter of Andrew's uncle, Albertino Morosini in 1293.

Charles Martel died of the plague in Naples on 12 August 1295. After his death, the Pope confirmed Mary's sole rights in Hungary on 30 August 1295. She was the representative of her son at the negotiations with the Pope in 1295-96. Between 1296 and 1298, she served as regent of Naples in the absence of her consort. She served as regent the last time in 1302. After this, she lost her influence over state affairs, and retired to pious duties such as to finance convents and churches.

A group of powerful lords—including the Šubići, Kőszegis and Csáks—urged Mary's husband Charles II of Naples to send Charles Robert, the 12-year-old son of Charles Martel, to Hungary in order to become king. The young Charles Robert disembarked in Split in August 1300. Although many lords in Croatia and Slavonian and most Dalmatian towns recognized him as king before he marched to Zagreb, Charles Robert was unsuccessful, because powerful Hungarian nobles, including the Kőszegis and Matthew Csák, reconciled with Andrew. Andrew's envoy to the Holy See noted that Pope Boniface VIII did not support Charles Robert's adventure, either. Andrew, who had been in poor health for a while, was planning to capture Charles Robert, but he died in Buda Castle on 14 January 1301.

After Andrew's sudden death, Charles Robert hurried to Esztergom where the Archbishop-elect, Gregory Bicskei, crowned him with a provisional crown before 13 May. However, most Hungarians considered Charles's coronation unlawful because customary law required that it should have been performed with the Holy Crown of Hungary in Székesfehérvár. During the following few years, different claimants fought for the Hungarian throne until Charles was finally proclaimed king on 27 November 1308 at the Diet in Pest. , and finally crowned on 27 August 1310 in Székesfehérvár. Ultimately the claims of the sisters Mary and Catherine were united in a common descendant when the pair's great-great-granddaughter, Mary of Hungary, ascended to the Hungarian throne in 1382. When the line of Charles Martel and the Angevins in Hungary died out, it was Sigismund, a remote descendant of Bela IV, whose family succeeded.

== Later life ==
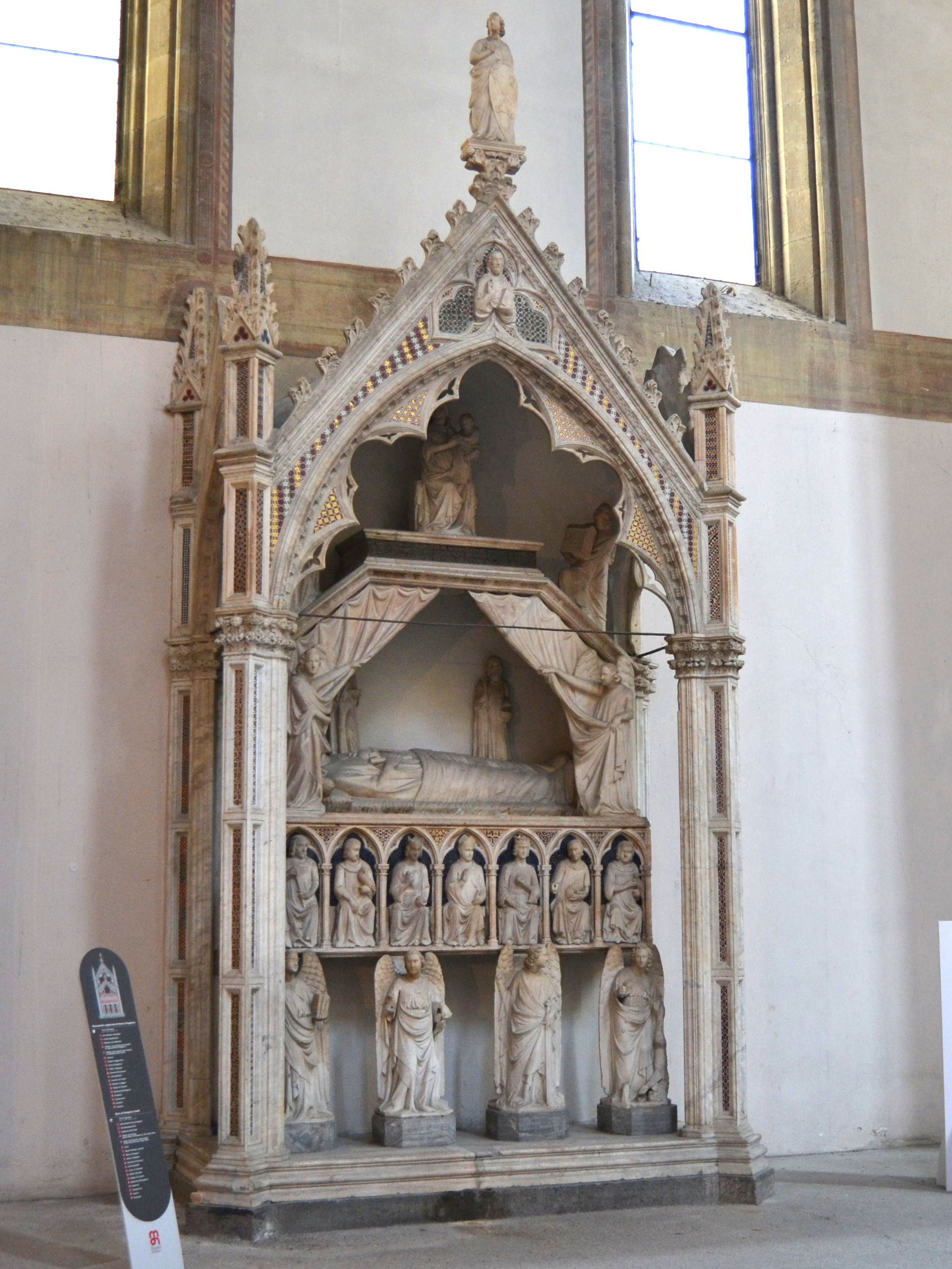
Mary's tomb in Naples

Mary's husband Charles of Naples died in May 1309. There is no evidence that Mary became a nun, as has sometimes been rumored, but she did spend a lot of her time in convents. She lived in Naples for the rest of her life, where she died on 25 March 1323. She was buried in Naples at the Santa Maria Donna Regina.

== Children ==
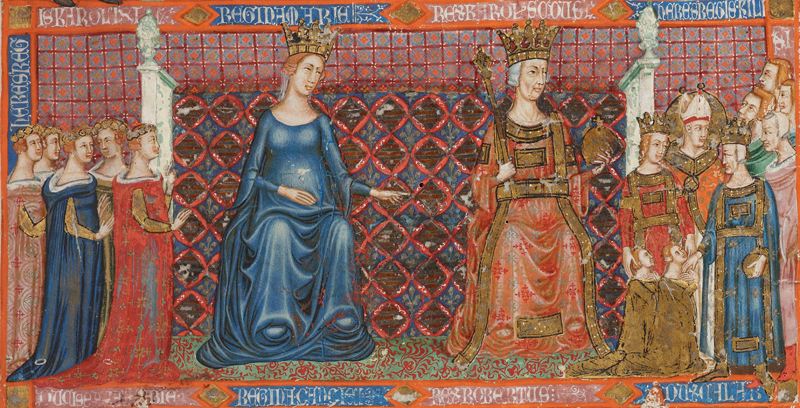
Mary, Charles and their children in Bible of Naples

Mary and her husband had fourteen children:

1. Charles Martel (1271 – 1295), titular King of Hungary.
2. Margaret (1273 – December 31, 1299), Countess of Anjou and Maine, married at Corbeil August 16, 1290 Charles of Valois, brother of king of France, and became ancestress of the Valois dynasty.
3. Louis (February 9, 1274, Nocera – August 19, 1297, Chateau de Brignoles), Bishop of Toulouse, later canonized.
4. Robert I (1276 – 1343) King of Naples.
5. Philip I (1278 – 1331) Prince of Achaea and Taranto, Despot of Romania, Lord of Durazzo, titular Emperor of Constantinople
6. Blanche (1280 – October 14, 1310, Barcelona), married at Villebertran November 1, 1295 James II of Aragon
7. Raymond Berengar (1281 – 1307), Count of Provence, Prince of Piedmont and Andria.
8. John (1283 – aft. March 16, 1308), a priest.
9. Tristan (1284 – bef. 1288)
10. Eleanor, (August 1289 – August 9, 1341, Monastery of St. Nicholas, Arene, Elis), married at Messina May 17, 1302 Frederick III of Sicily
11. Maria (1290 – c. 1346), married firstly at Palma de Majorca September 20, 1304 Sancho I of Majorca, married secondly 1326 Jaime de Ejerica (1298 – April 1335).
12. Peter (1291 – August 29, 1315, Battle of Montecatini), Count of Gravina
13. John (1294 – April 5, 1336, Naples), Duke of Durazzo, Prince of Achaea, and Count of Gravina, married March 1318 (divorced 1321) Matilda of Hainaut (November 29, 1293 – 1336), and married secondly November 14, 1321 Agnes of Périgord (d. 1345)
14. Beatrice (1295 – c. 1321), married firstly April 1305 Azzo VIII d'Este, Marquis of Ferrara (d. 1308), married secondly 1309 Bertrand III of Baux, Count of Andria (d. 1351).

== In fiction ==
Marie of Hungary is a character in Les Rois maudits (The Accursed Kings), a series of French historical novels by Maurice Druon. She was portrayed by Denise Grey in the 1972 French miniseries adaptation of the series, and by Line Renaud in the 2005 adaptation.

== See also ==
- Cuman people
- Cumania

== Sources ==
- Abulafia, David, ed. (1999). The New Cambridge Medieval History, Volume 5, c.1198–c.1300. Cambridge: Cambridge University Press. ISBN 978-1-13905573-4.
- Abulafia, David (2000). "The Italian south". In Jones, Michael (ed.). The New Cambridge Medieval History, Volume 6, c.1300–c.1415. Cambridge: Cambridge University Press. ISBN 978-1-13905574-1.
- Bartl, Július; Čičaj, Viliam; Kohútova, Mária; Letz, Róbert; Segeš, Vladimír; Škvarna, Dušan (2002). Slovak History: Chronology & Lexicon. Bolchazy-Carducci Publishers, Slovenské Pedegogické Nakladatel'stvo. ISBN 0-86516-444-4.
- Berend, Nora; Urbańczyk, Przemysław; Wiszewski, Przemysław (2013). Central Europe in the High Middle Ages: Bohemia, Hungary and Poland, c. 900-c. 1300. Cambridge University Press. ISBN 978-0-521-78156-5.
- Dunbabin, Jean (2015). The French in the Kingdom of Sicily, 1266-1305. Cambridge University Press.
- Engel, Pál (2001). The Realm of St Stephen: A History of Medieval Hungary, 895–1526. I.B. Tauris Publishers. ISBN 1-86064-061-3.
- Érszegi, Géza; Solymosi, László (1981). "Az Árpádok királysága, 1000–1301 [The Monarchy of the Árpáds, 1000–1301]". In Solymosi, László (ed.). Magyarország történeti kronológiája, I: a kezdetektől 1526-ig [Historical Chronology of Hungary, Volume I: From the Beginning to 1526] (in Hungarian). Akadémiai Kiadó. pp. 79–187. ISBN 963-05-2661-1.
- Fine, John V. A., Jr. (1994) [1987]. The Late Medieval Balkans: A Critical Survey from the Late Twelfth Century to the Ottoman Conquest. Ann Arbor, Michigan: University of Michigan Press. ISBN 978-0-472-10079-8.
- Hoch, Adrian S. (1995). "The Franciscan Provenance of Simone Martini's Angevin St. Louis in Naples". Zeitschrift für Kunstgeschichte. 58. Bd., H. 1.
- Kristó, Gyula (2002). "I. Károly". In Kristó, Gyula (ed.). Magyarország vegyes házi királyai [The Kings of Various Dynasties of Hungary] (in Hungarian). Szukits Könyvkiadó. pp. 23–44. ISBN 963-9441-58-9.
- Krstić, Aleksandar R. (2016). "The Rival and the Vassal of Charles Robert of Anjou: King Vladislav II Nemanjić". Banatica. 26 (2): 33–51.
- Magaš, Branka (2007). Croatia Through History. SAQI. ISBN 978-0-86356-775-9.
- Solymosi, László; Körmendi, Adrienne (1981). "A középkori magyar állam virágzása és bukása, 1301–1506 [The Heyday and Fall of the Medieval Hungarian State, 1301–1526]". In Solymosi, László (ed.). Magyarország történeti kronológiája, I: a kezdetektől 1526-ig [Historical Chronology of Hungary, Volume I: From the Beginning to 1526] (in Hungarian). Akadémiai Kiadó. pp. 188–228. ISBN 963-05-2661-1.
- Zsoldos, Attila (2003). "III. András". In Szovák, Kornél; Szentpéteri, József; Szakács, Margit (eds.). Szent István és III. András [Saint Stephen and Andrew III] (in Hungarian). Kossuth Kiadó. pp. 119–227. ISBN 963-09-4461-8.

Preceded by Margaret of Burgundy	Queen consort of Naples; 1285 – 5 May 1309	Succeeded by Sancha of Majorca
Preceded by Margaret of Burgundy	Princess consort of Achaea; 1285–1289	Vacant Achaea returned to Isabella of Villehardouin as princess suo jure Title next held by Thamar Angelina Komnene
