= Maria of Naples =

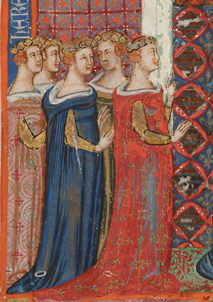
- Maria and her sisters in the Bible of Naples

Queen consort of Majorca
- Tenure: 29 May 1311 – 4 September 1324
- Predecessor: Esclaramunda of Foix
- Successor: Constance of Aragon
- Born: 1290
- Died: 1346/7
- Spouse: Sancho of Majorca
- House: Capetian House of Anjou
- Father: Charles II of Naples
- Mother: Mary of Hungary

Maria of Anjou (1290 – end of April 1346/January 1347) was a member of the Capetian House of Anjou who served as Queen of Majorca during her marriage to King Sancho of Majorca. She was the daughter of King Charles II of Naples and his wife, Mary of Hungary.

Maria married King Sancho by proxy at Palma de Majorca on 20 September 1304 and in person in 1308. The marriage produced no children, which threatened the survival of the young independent state. Sancho willed the kingdom to his nephew James to prevent it from falling to the Crown of Aragon, and died in 1324.

Two years after Sancho's death, Maria married James of Ejerica, a member of the House of Barcelona. She was imprisoned in Jerica in 1331 by King Alfonso IV of Aragon, and was later transferred to Valencia. Her brother, King Robert of Naples, arranged her release, and she left Valencia after June 1337 for Barjols in Provence. Maria died childless in 1346 or 1347.

== Ancestry ==
Ancestors of Maria of Naples

16. Philip II of France
8. Louis VIII of France
17. Isabelle of Hainaut
4. Charles I of Naples
18. Alfonso VIII of Castile
9. Blanche of Castile
19. Eleanor of England
2. Charles II of Naples
20. Alfonso II, Count of Provence
10. Ramon Berenguer IV, Count of Provence
21. Garsenda, Countess of Forcalquier
5. Beatrice of Provence
22. Thomas I of Savoy
11. Beatrice of Savoy
23. Margaret of Geneva
1. Maria of Anjou
24. Andrew II of Hungary
12. Béla IV of Hungary
25. Gertrude of Merania
6. Stephen V of Hungary
26. Theodore I Laskaris
13. Maria Laskarina
27. Anna Angelina
3. Maria of Hungary
28. Suthoi, Khan of Cumania
14. Kuthen, Khan of Cumania
7. Elizabeth the Cuman
15. Mstislawna

== Sources ==
- Dunbabin, Jean (2011). The French in the Kingdom of Sicily, 1266–1305. Cambridge University Press.

Maria of Naples Capetian House of Anjou Cadet branch of the House of Capet Born: circa 1290 Died: circa 1346/7
Royal titles
Preceded by Esclaramunda of Foix	Queen consort of Majorca; 1311–1324	Succeeded by Constance of Aragon
