= Charles d'Artois =

Charles d'Artois (Italian: Carlo Artus; c. 1300 – September 1346) was a Neapolitan nobleman and court official.

Charles was born in c. 1300 as the illegitimate son of Robert, heir apparent to the throne of Naples. His mother was Cantelma Cantelmo, lady of the bedchamber to Robert's wife, Sancia of Majorca. Robert became King of Naples in 1309, and Charles was raised at his court as a royal bastard. In 1317, he became chamberlain to his father and was given rule over Pennaluce. The following year, Charles was made guardian of the Castle of Santa Maria del Monte. He was given further lands in 1322, namely the barony of Roccaromana. On his deathbed in 1343, King Robert named Charles and Queen Sancia as guardians of Robert's granddaughters (Charles's nieces) Joanna and Maria.

On King Robert's death, the crown passed to his granddaughter and Charles's niece, Queen Joanna I. She named her uncle Chancellor of the Realm and her personal counselor on 20 May 1345. On that occasion, he also became Count of Sant'Agata de' Goti. Charles was one of the principal plotters against his niece's husband, King Andrew. When Andrew was murdered in September 1345, Charles was sentenced to death. He fled the court along with his eldest son, Bertrand, and took refuge in his county. Catherine II, Latin Empress, and her son Louis of Taranto captured Charles, who died of stress or poison in Melfi on 31 August or in early September 1346. He was buried in the Church of Saint Francis in Sant'Agata de' Goti.

By his wife, Marianna Scotto, Charles had four sons: Bertrand (assassin of King Andrew), Louis (Charles's successor as Count of Sant'Agata de' Goti), Carlotto and Rostaino.

== Bibliography ==
- Van Kerrebrouck, Patrick (2000). Les Capétiens: 987-1328. Vol. 2. Franz Steiner Verlag. ISBN 2950150942.
