= Violant of Hungary =

Queen of Aragon from 1235 to 1251

Queen consort of Aragon
- Tenure: 1235 – 1251
- Born: c. 1215
- Died: c. 1251 (aged 36)?
- Burial: Monastery of Santa Maria de Vallbona
- Spouse: James I of Aragon (m. 1235)
- Issue among others...: Yolanda, Queen of Castile; Constance, Lady of Villena; Peter III of Aragon; James II of Majorca; Isabella, Queen of France
- House: Árpád
- Father: Andrew II of Hungary
- Mother: Yolanda of Courtenay

Violant of Hungary (Hungarian: Jolán; Catalan: Iolanda or Violant d'Hongria; Spanish: Yolanda or Violante de Hungría; c. 1215 – c. 1251) was the queen of Aragon from 1235 until 1251 as the second wife of King James I of Aragon. A member of the Hungarian House of Árpád, she was a valuable and influential advisor of her husband. She remains in folk memory in Catalonia and Valencia.

== Family ==
Violant was born at Esztergom circa 1215, the only child of King Andrew II of Hungary and his second wife, Yolanda of Courtenay. Violant married King James I of Aragon in 1235. James had already been married to Eleanor of Castile, but he had this marriage annulled on the basis of consanguinity in 1229. He and Eleanor had a son, Alfonso, who was considered legitimate, but who died before James.

James and Violant had ten children:

1. Violant (1236–1301), Queen of Castile by her marriage to Alfonso X of Castile
2. Constance (1239–1269), married Manuel of Castile, son of Ferdinand III
3. Peter III of Aragon (1240–1285)
4. James II of Majorca (1243–1311)
5. Ferdinand (1245–1250)
6. Sancha (1246 – before 1275), died in Acre.
7. Isabella (1247–1271), Queen of France by her marriage to Philip III of France
8. Maria (1248–1267), nun
9. Sancho (1250–1275), Archbishop of Toledo
10. Eleanor (born 1251, died young)

== Queenship ==
A large number of Hungarian knights escorted the queen to her new homeland with the leadership of Denis of Hungary. Queen Violant was a woman of talent and character. Next to King James I, she had an important political role in the Crown of Aragon. She was one of the most valuable advisors of the king, on whom she had a strong influence. She intervened decisively in international agreements as important as the Treaty of Almizra with Castile (1244). It was signed with the condition that Zayyan ibn Mardanish would surrender the city of Valencia, into which she triumphantly entered with her husband on 9 October 1238.

== Death and burial ==
Violant reportedly died in September 1251. Jerónimo Zurita, in his Anales de Aragon, mentions a discrepancy, and writes that while some annals state that Violant died in Santa María de Salas in 1251, others report that she lived longer (some sources point to 1253 as a probable date), and that she only made her will and testament in Huesca in 1251. Zurita continues that her will stipulated her burial at Vallbona, bequeathed the county of Posana (Pozsony) to her sons Peter, James, and Sancho (Pozsony being in the possession of her half-brother Béla IV of Hungary, but apparently left to her by her mother Queen Yolanda), and mentioned that she had 5 daughters with the king.

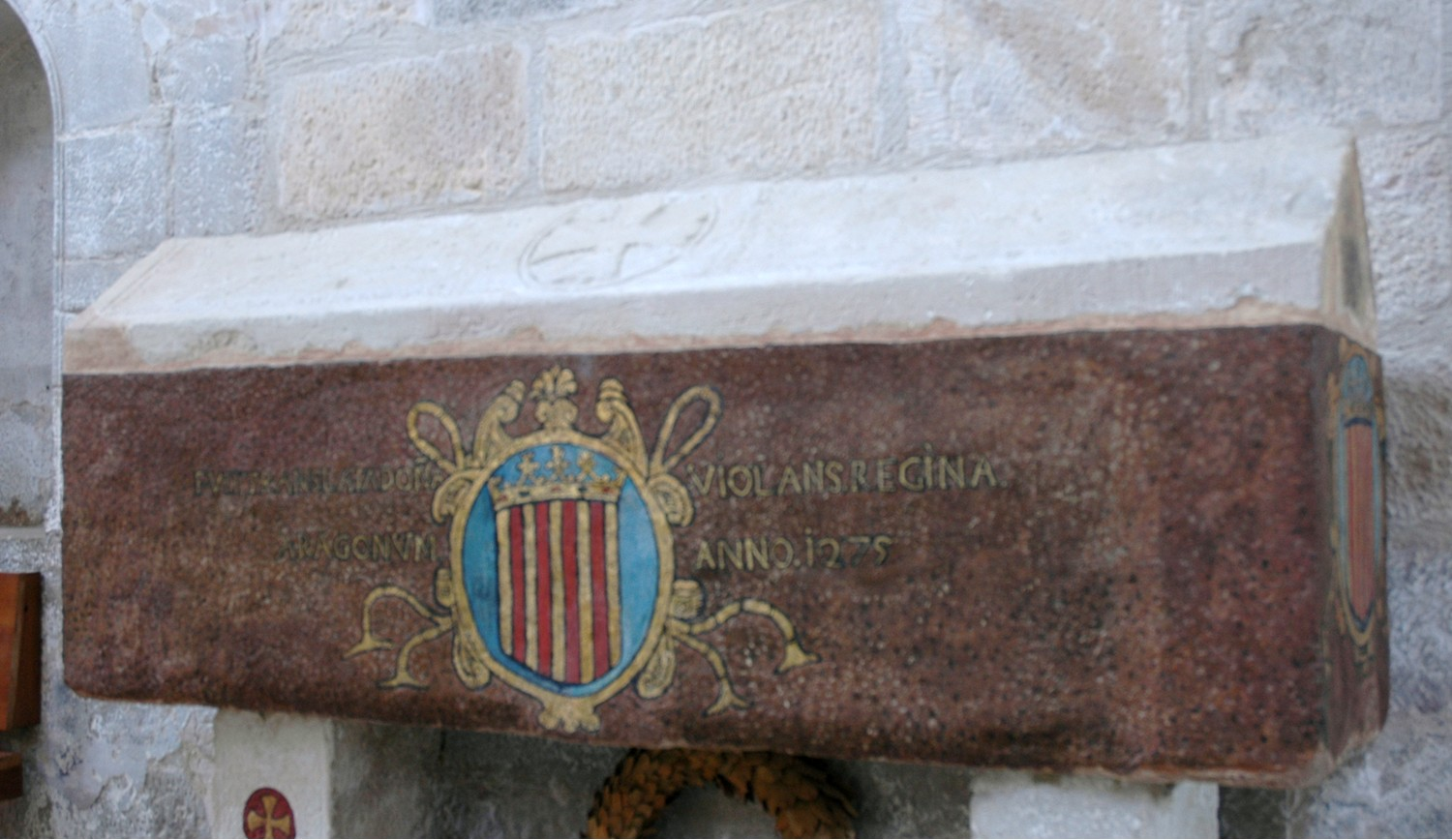
Tomb of Violant of Hungary

Violant and her daughter Sancha's remains are at the Monastery of Santa Maria de Vallbona in Vallbona de les Monges, Catalonia. Violant chose burial in that monastery, as she was a benefactor. Her tomb, placed along the wall on the right of the chancel, is fairly simple. It is raised on two pillars decorated with individual gold crosses inscribed in red (gules) circles, and has a gabled lid of white stone. In the center of the lid is a cross with the same characteristics as those on the pillars, but larger and without color. The only ornamentations on the box itself are three depictions of her husband's royal coat of arms – one on the visible side and one at each end. The Queen's remains were moved to the tomb in 1275, as indicated by the inscription on the visible side of the box: Fuit translata donna | Violán regina | Aragonum | anno 1275. In 2002, the Hungarian government financed a restoration of her tomb, costing 12,000 euros, but the monastic community denied permission to study its interior. Violant is the only member of the Árpád dynasty whose remains are undisturbed.

James I remarried one more time, to Teresa Gil de Vidaure, who was previously his mistress.

== Legacy ==
Since the nineteenth century, streets have been dedicated to Queen Violant in Barcelona, Zaragoza, and other cities in the counties and kingdoms of the former Crown of Aragon. 9 October is the national day of the Valencian Community, which commemorates the Christian reconquest and the day on which James I and Violant entered the city. The celebration is known as the Mocadorada of Sant Dionís, since 9 October is the feast day of Saint Denis of Paris. Men typically give their partners a scarf (Catalan: mocador) containing candied fruits and vegetables made of marzipan; these candies represent the fruits and vegetables that Valencian Muslims offered James and Violant when they entered the city, according to legend.

== Sources ==
- Laszlovzky, Jozsef (2016). "Local tradition or European patterns? The grave of Queen Gertrude in the Pilis Cistercian Abbey". In Jaritz, Gerhard; Szende, Katalin (eds.). Medieval East Central Europe in a Comparative Perspective: From Frontier Zones to Lands in Focus. Routledge. pp. 81–98.
- Martin, Theresa, ed. (2012). Reassessing the Roles of Women as 'Makers' of Medieval Art and Architecture. Brill.
- Smith, Damian J.; Buffery, Helen, eds. (2010). The Book of Deeds of James I of Aragon. Ashgate Publishing.
- Widmayer, Jeffrey S. (1994). "The Chronicle of Montpellier H119:Text, Translation and Commentary". In Kooper, Erik (ed.). The Medieval Chronicle IV. Rodopi. pp. 231–261.
- Woodacre, Elena, ed. (2013). Queenship in the Mediterranean: Negotiating the Role of the Queen in the Medieval and Early Modern Eras. Palgrave Macmillan.

Violant of Hungary House of Árpád Born: circa 1215 Died: 12 October 1251
Royal titles
Preceded by Eleanor of Castile	Queen consort of Aragon; 1235–1253	Succeeded by Constance of Sicily
New title	Queen consort of Majorca; 1235–1253	Succeeded by Esclaramunda of Foix
New title	Queen consort of Valencia; 1238–1253	Succeeded by Constance of Sicily
