= Pina, Mallorca =

Pina
- Town
- Location in Spain
- Country: Spain
- Autonomous community: Balearic Islands
- Province: Balearic Islands
- Time zone: UTC+1 (CET)
  - Summer (DST): UTC+2 (CEST)
- Official language(s): Catalan, Spanish

Pina is a small town on Mallorca (Spain). Located in south-central Mallorca, it is an autonomous community of the Balearic Islands.

Pina was named after Fernando Pina, due to his involvement in the conquest of Valencia. Its main attractions include the Church of San Cosme and San Damian, the cross and the convent.

Gabriel Mariano Ribas composed his works in Pina in 1856. With his brother Concepción Ribas de Pina, Gabriel founded the convent of the Franciscan Daughters of Mercy in Pina on September 14, 1856.
