= Alfonso III of Aragon =

King of Aragon and Valencia from 1285 to 1291

Alfonso III
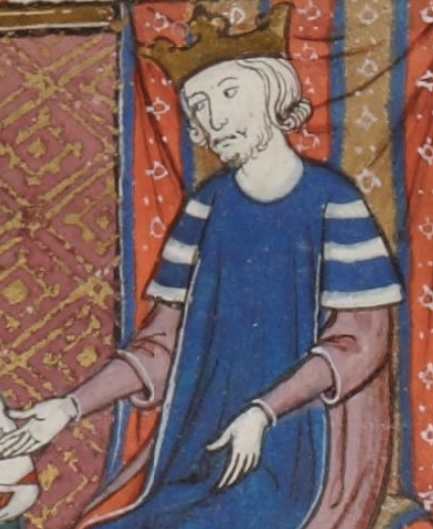
- Medieval miniature of Alfonso III, c. 1315–1325

King of Aragon and Valencia Count of Barcelona
- Reign: November 1285 – 18 June 1291
- Coronation: 2 February 1286, Valencia; 9 April 1286, Zaragoza
- Predecessor: Peter III
- Successor: James II
- Born: 4 November 1265; Valencia, Kingdom of Valencia
- Died: 18 June 1291 (aged 25); Barcelona, Principality of Catalonia
- Burial: Barcelona Cathedral; prev. Convent de Sant Francesc, Barcelona
- House: House of Barcelona
- Father: Peter III of Aragon
- Mother: Constance II of Sicily

Alfonso III (4 November 1265 – 18 June 1291), called the Liberal (el Liberal) and the Free (also "the Frank", from el Franc), was king of Aragon and Valencia, and count of Barcelona (as Alfons II) from 1285 until his death. He conquered the Kingdom of Majorca between his succession and 1287.

== Life ==
Alfonso was the son of King Peter III of Aragon and Constance, daughter and heiress of King Manfred of Sicily.

Soon after assuming the throne, he conducted a campaign to reincorporate the Balearic Islands into the Crown of Aragon, which had been lost due to the division of the realm by his grandfather, James I of Aragon. Thus in 1285 he declared war on his uncle, James II of Majorca, and conquered both Majorca (1285) and Ibiza (1286), effectively reassuming suzerainty over the Kingdom of Majorca. He followed this with the conquest of Menorca – until then an autonomous Muslim state (Manûrqa) within the Kingdom of Majorca – on 17 January 1287, the anniversary of which now serves as Menorca's national holiday.

Alfonso initially sought to maintain Aragonese control over Sicily by supporting the claims of his brother James II to the island. However, he later retracted his support for his brother shortly before his death and instead tried to make peace with the Papal States and with France.

His reign was marred by a constitutional struggle with the Aragonese nobles, which eventually culminated in the articles of the Union of Aragon – the so-called "Magna Carta of Aragon", which devolved several key royal powers into the hands of lesser nobles. His inability to resist the demands of his nobles was to leave a heritage of disunity in Aragon and further dissent amongst the nobility, who increasingly saw little reason to respect the throne, and brought the Kingdom of Aragon close to anarchy.

During his lifetime a dynastic marriage with Eleanor, daughter of King Edward I of England, was arranged. However, Alfonso died before meeting his bride, at the age of 25 in 1291, and was buried in the Franciscan convent in Barcelona; since 1852 his remains have been buried in Barcelona Cathedral.

In 1289, Alfonso III established the Order of the Collar of Paternò, in support of defence of Menorca. The Order subsuqently became a dynastic order of the Royal House of Aragon.

== In culture ==
Dante Alighieri, in the Divine Comedy, recounts that he saw Alfonso's spirit seated outside the gates of Purgatory with the other monarchs whom Dante blamed for the chaotic political state of Europe during the 13th century.

== Sources ==
- Lodge, Eleanor Constance (1924). The End of the Middle Age, 1273-1453. Methuen & Company Limited.

Alfonso III of Aragon House of Barcelona Born: c. 1265 Died: 18 June 1291
Regnal titles
Preceded by Peter the Great	King of Aragon and Valencia; Count of Barcelona; 1285–1291	Succeeded by James the Just
Preceded by James the Prudent	King of Majorca disputed with James the Prudent; 1286–1291	Succeeded by James the Just
