= Roger IV of Foix =

French aristocrat

Roger IV (died 24 February 1265), son and successor of Roger-Bernard II the Great, was the eighth count of Foix from 1241 to his death. His mother was Ermessenda de Castellbò. His reign began with the south again at war with the north in France and, though he was reluctant to join his father's old ally, Raymond VII of Toulouse, in revolt and he did not aid the king of England, Henry III, in his Saintonge War.

Roger IV was a vassal of both the count of Toulouse (for his county of Foix) and the king of France (for his Carcassonne lands), then Louis IX. His loyalty to the king, however, took precedence and war broke out with Raymond VII (October 1242). Although Raymond was forced to submit to the king on 30 November, the war with Roger continued until January 1243, when the king ended it. The count of Foix was now solely a vassal of the king and Raymond spent the rest of his life (until 1249) trying to retrieve Roger's homage, to no avail.

Like his father, Roger IV had troubles with the church and the bishop of Urgel in particular and, in 1257, he successfully released the viscounty of Castelbon from the bishop's jurisdiction. In February 1245, he gave many freedoms to his subjects and he signed paréages with the abbots of Mas-d'Azil (1246), Boulbonne (1253), and Combelongue (1255). In 1251, he built the church at Boulbonne, transferred his ancestors' remains there, and defended it against the exactions of numerous enemies. He persecuted Catharism, the heresy of his mother, Ermesinda of Castlebon, in order not to be at odds with the Inquisition.

== Death ==
He died on 24 February 1265 and was interred in Boulbonne next to his father.

== Marriage and children ==
Roger married Brunissenda of Cardona, a daughter of Ramon VIII, Viscount of Cardona. They had six children:

- Roger-Bernard III of Foix (died 1302).
- Peter of Foix.
- Sybille of Foix. Married Aimery IV, Viscount of Narbonne.
- Ines of Foix. Married Eschivat III, Count of Bigorre
- Philippa of Foix. Married Arnauld, Count of Pailhars.
- Esclaramunda of Foix. Married James II of Majorca.

== Sources ==
- Beltran, Vicenç (2014). "Guilhem de Montanhagol, faidit". In Beltran, Vicenç; Martínez, Tomàs; Capdevila, Irene (eds.). 800 anys després de Muret. Els trobadors i les relacions catalanooccitanes. Publicacions i Edicions de la Universitat de Barcelona.
- Morby, John E.; Rozier, Charlie (2014). "The County of Foix". Dynasties of the World (2 ed.). Oxford University Press.

Preceded by Roger Bernard II the Great	Count of Foix; 1241–1265	Succeeded by Roger Bernard III
