= Treaty of Anagni =

1295 treaty

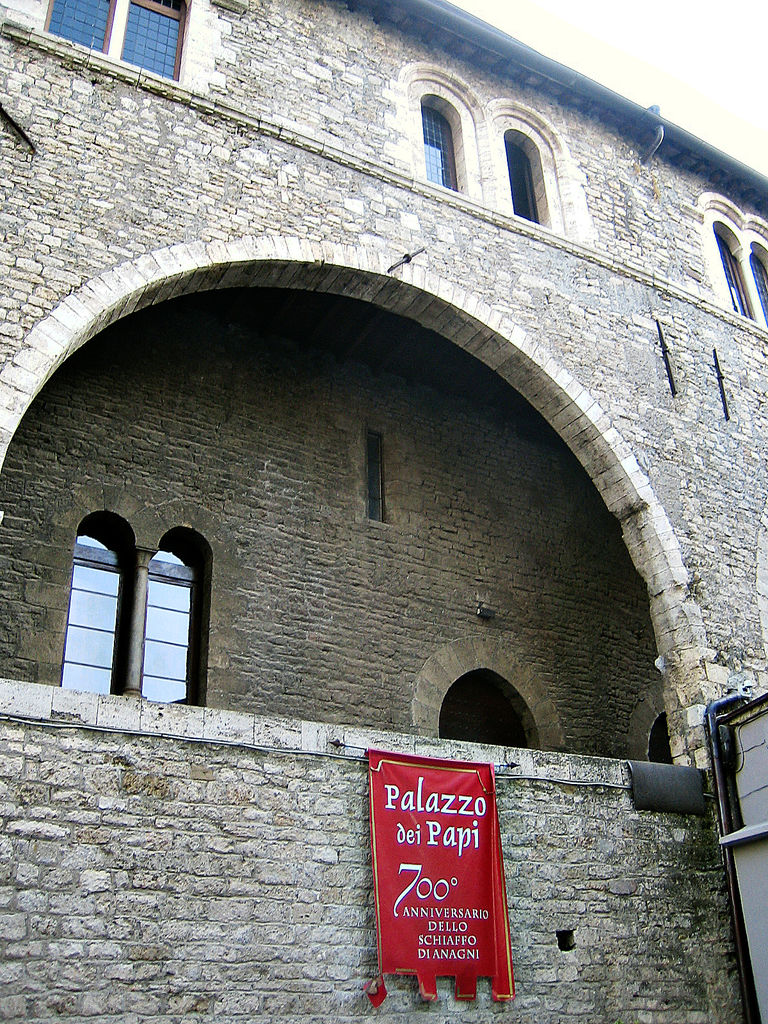
Anagni, Lazio, Pope's Palace and banner

The Treaty of Anagni was an accord between the Pope Boniface VIII, James II of Aragon, Philip IV of France, Charles II of Naples, and James II of Majorca. It was signed on 20 June 1295 at Anagni, in central Italy. The chief purpose was to confirm the Treaty of Tarascon of 1291, which ended the Aragonese Crusade. It also dealt with finding a diplomatic solution to the conquest of Sicily by Peter III of Aragón in 1285.

Neither Frederick II of Sicily, James of Aragon's brother, nor the Sicilian people accepted the treaty and instead pursued a war against the Angevin forces of Charles of Naples. Charles was, as per the respective clause of the treaty, assisted by the fleet of James of Aragón. This war did not end until the Peace of Caltabellotta in 1302.

== Main clauses ==
- marriage of James of Aragon with Blanche, daughter of Charles
- return of Sicily to the papacy, which granted it to Charles
- military aid from James of Aragón to Charles for the reconquest of Sicily (see above)
- lifting of the excommunication of James of Aragon
- renunciation of Charles of Valois of the Aragonese crown
- restitution of the Balearic Islands to James of Majorca
- arbitration of the pope over the Aran Valley
- restitution to Charles of James of Aragon's conquests in Italy
- exchange of prisoners and hostages, including the release (on 7 June) of Louis, Robert, and Raymond Berengar, sons of Charles, by James of Aragón

== Secret clauses ==
Two secret clauses were later added:

- cession of Corsica and Sardinia to James of Aragon
- military aid from Aragon to France against Edward I of England
