= James II of Majorca =

King of Majorca (1243–1311)

James II
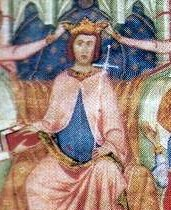

King of Majorca
- Reign: 1276–1286, 1295–1311
- Predecessor: James I
- Successor: Sancho
- Born: 31 May 1243
- Died: 29 May 1311 (aged 67)
- Spouse: Esclaramunda of Foix
- Issue: James; Sancho, King of Majorca; Sancha, Queen of Naples; Elizabeth, Princess of Villena; Ferdinand, Viscount of Aumelas; Philip, Regent of Majorca
- House: Barcelona
- Father: James I of Aragon
- Mother: Violant of Hungary

Coat of Arms of the Kings of Majorca used only abroad

James II (Catalan: Jaume) (31 May 1243 – 29 May 1311) was King of Majorca and Lord of Montpellier from 1276 until his death. He was the second son of James I of Aragon and his wife, Violant, daughter of Andrew II of Hungary. In 1279, by the Treaty of Perpignan, he became a vassal of the Crown of Aragon.

== Biography ==
James inherited from his father a realm including three of the Balearic Islands (Mallorca, Ibiza, and Formentera), the counties of Roussillon and Cerdanya, the dominion of Montpellier, the barony of Aumelàs, and the viscounty of Carladès. He also gained tribute from the fourth Balearic island, Menorca, which remained under Muslim control throughout his life. He ruled as a vassal of his brother Peter III of Aragon, a subordinate status which he sought to escape.

In 1276, his former seneschal, Ramon Llull persuaded James to fund a language school for Franciscan missionaries at Miramar.

France and Aragon contested for control of Sicily. James held rights over borderlands that were indefensible and, in anticipation of an invasion, reached an agreement with king Philip III of France (the widower of his sister, Isabella). This strained relations between Aragon and Majorca. Peter of Aragon seized Perpignan, and although James was able to escape, Peter sent two of James' sons to Barcelona. With this, James sided with the French. His nephew Alfonso III of Aragon annexed the Balearic Islands to Aragon in the conquest, but they were returned by the Treaty of Anagni in 1295.

Following this reversion, James made an effort to improve the viability of the kingdom on the domestic front. He devoted himself to running his kingdom by reforming urbanism, establishing agricultural policy, emphasising defence, and reforming the economy. He implemented a vast policy of agricultural colonisation with the creation of rural centres; increase royal rents; favoured the creation of a consulate in the Kingdom of Granada; created a new monetary system for the kingdom; promoted the creation of textile industries; proceeded to increase the power of the crown over that of the nobility and the Church; and ordered the construction of several palaces and castles, including the palace at Perpignan, the Palace of Almudaina, the Cathedral of Santa María at Palma de Mallorca, known today as La Seu, and, finally, Bellver Castle. The opening of criminal proceedings against the Knights Templar and their later suppression would allow the seizure of the tithes of the Templars on the islands.

Although a vassal of Aragon, in 1302 James began to create his own consulates along the North African coast.

== Family ==
James wed Esclaramunda of Foix in 1275 through a marriage arranged by his own initiative and not that of his father. Esclaramunda was a daughter of Roger IV of Foix. They had six children including:

- James, who became a Franciscan friar before his father's death.
- Sancho, James II's successor
- Sancha, who married Robert of Naples.
- Elizabeth, wife of Juan Manuel, Prince of Villena.
- Ferdinand, father of James III.
- Philip, regent of Majorca during James III's minority

He also had an illegitimate daughter:

- Saura, who married Berengeur de Villaragut. They had a daughter, Violante of Vilaragut.

James II of Majorca House of Barcelona Born: 31 May 1243 Died: 29 May 1311
Preceded by James the Conqueror	King of Majorca; 1276–1286	Succeeded by Afonso the Liberal
Preceded by James the Conqueror	Count of Roussillon and Cerdanya; Lord of Montpellier; 1276–1311	Succeeded by Sancho
Preceded by James the Just	King of Majorca; 1295-1311	Succeeded by Sancho
