= Esclaramunda of Foix =

Queen consort of Majorca from 1276–1311

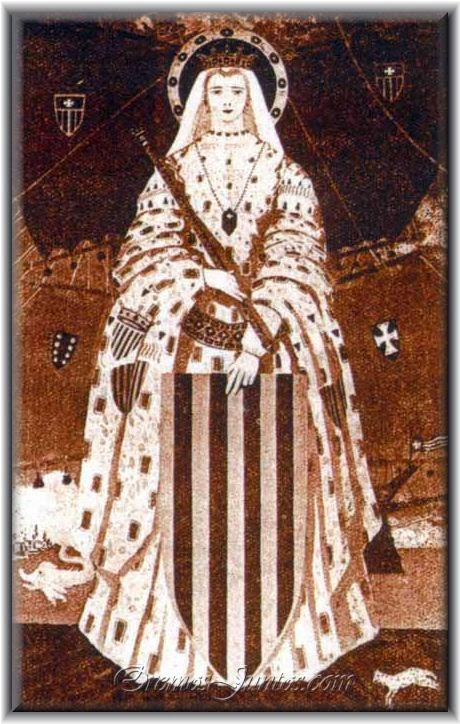
- Born: 1250
- Died: 1315 (aged 64–65); Perpignan
- Spouse: James II of Majorca
- Issue: James of Majorca; Sancho; Sancha of Majorca, Queen of Naples; Philip of Majorca; Elizabeth, Princess of Villena; Ferdinand of Majorca
- House: Foix
- Father: Roger IV, Count of Foix
- Mother: Brunissenda of Cardona

Esclaramunda of Foix (1250–1315) was Queen consort of Majorca from 1276-1311.

== Life ==
She was the daughter of Roger IV of Foix and Brunisenda of Cardona, daughter of Ramon VIII, Viscount of Cardona. Named after her great-grandmother, Esclaramunda was twenty years old when she married James II of Majorca. As the royal palace or castle was under construction, the new couple moved to Montpellier, but in July 1276 embarked for Majorca.

She was responsible for tutoring her grandson James III of Majorca. She was protector of the Order of Mercy. Her feast is on 22 October.

== Marriage and issue ==
In 1275, Esclaramunda married James II of Majorca, with whom she had six children:

- James, who became a Franciscan friar before his father's death.
- Sancho, James II's successor
- Sancha of Majorca, who married Robert of Naples.
- Ferdinand, father of James III
- Philip, regent of Majorca during James III's minority
- Elizabeth, wife of Juan Manuel, Prince of Villena.

She survived her husband by only five years, and died in Perpignan.
