= Robert, King of Naples =

King of Naples from 1309 to 1343

Robert
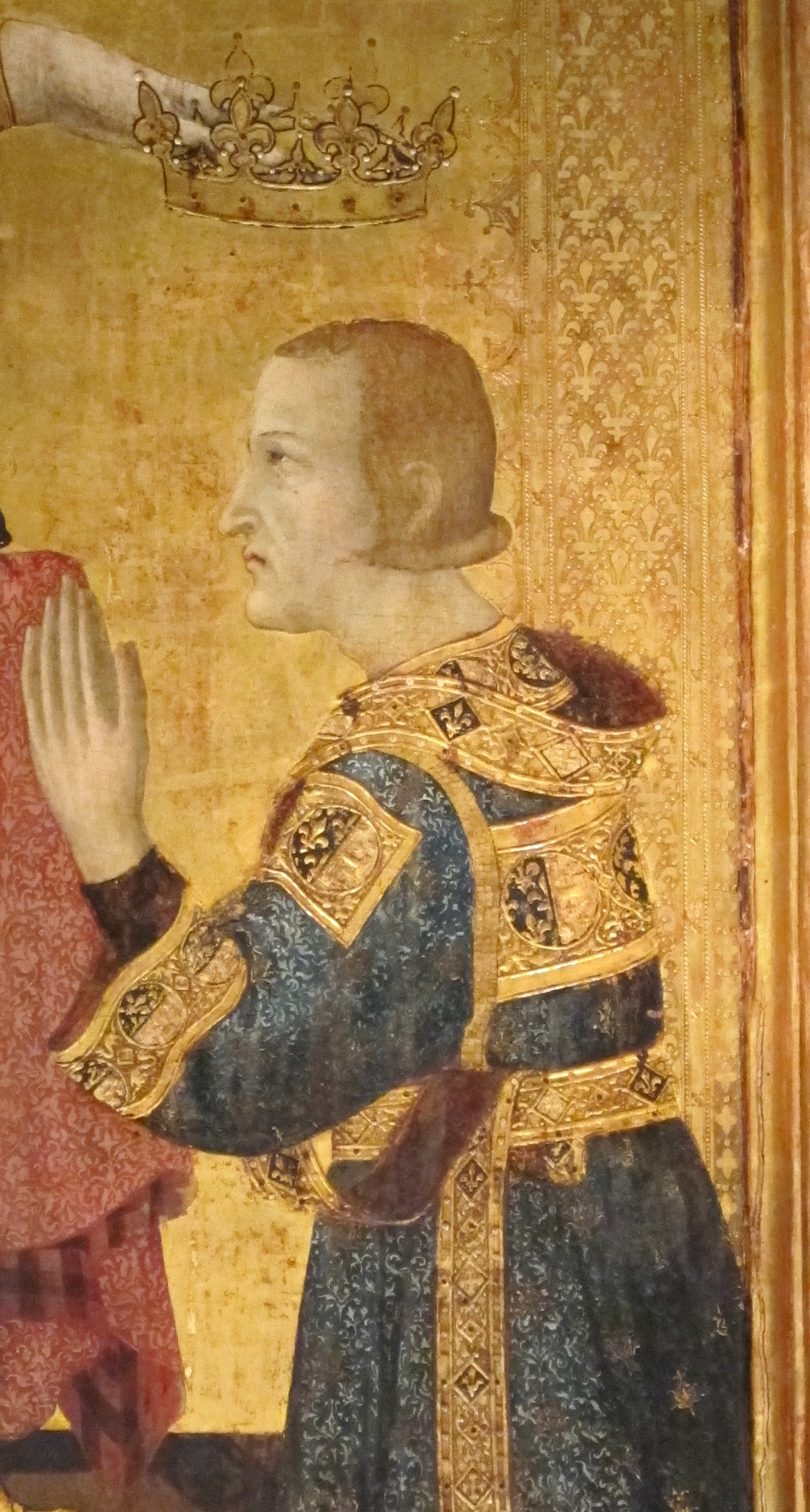
- Robert in a miniature by Simone Martini, 1317

King of Naples Count of Provence and Forcalquier
- Reign: 5 May 1309 – 20 January 1343
- Predecessor: Charles II
- Successor: Joanna I
- Born: 1276; Santa Maria Capua Vetere
- Died: 20 January 1343 (aged 67); Kingdom of Naples
- Spouse: Yolanda of Aragon; Sancha of Majorca
- Issue More: Charles, Duke of Calabria; Louis of Anjou (ill.) Charles d'Artois (ill.) Maria d'Aquino (ill.) Hélène of Anjou
- House: Anjou-Naples
- Father: Charles II of Naples
- Mother: Mary of Hungary

Robert of Anjou (Italian: Roberto d'Angiò), known as Robert the Wise (Italian: Roberto il Saggio; 1276 – 20 January 1343), was King of Naples, titular King of Jerusalem and Count of Provence and Forcalquier from 1309 to 1343, the central figure of Italian politics of his time. He was the third son of King Charles II of Naples and Mary of Hungary, and during his father's lifetime he was styled Duke of Calabria (1296–1309).

Robert's early life was marked by his family's participation in the War of the Sicilian Vespers, in which conflict Robert served as a military commander. Upon the death of his father in 1309, Robert ruled as the king of Naples. His reign brought relative stability to Naples compared to the reigns of his father and grandfather, but it was also marked by rivalries against Germanic powers in northern Italy and the House of Barcelona in the western Mediterranean. Robert was pre-deceased by his son and heir Charles of Calabria, and so willed his throne to his granddaughter, Joanna of Naples.

== Biography ==
=== Early life ===
Robert was born around 1276, the third son of the future Charles II of Naples (then heir apparent) and his wife Mary of Hungary. His father was the son of the incumbent King of Naples, Charles of Anjou, who had established an Italian realm a decade earlier in 1266. In 1282, the Angevin kingdom was shaken by the Sicilian Vespers, a revolt by the Sicilians against the rule of his grandfather Charles. The ensuing War of the Sicilian Vespers against the Sicilian rebels widened when the crown of Crown of Aragon intervened in support of the Sicilians.

The Sicilian conflict had a major effect on Robert's early life; in 1284, his father was captured in battle and became a prisoner of the Aragonese, and in 1285 Robert's grandfather died at Foggia while on campaign. When his imprisoned father assumed the throne of Naples in 1285, a period of stalemate in the war led to his father negotiating for his freedom from Aragonese captivity.

While Robert was sent to the Aragonese court as a political hostage, Charles II's eldest son, Charles Martel of Anjou was named as heir to the throne of Naples; he would die of the plague in 1295. His surviving son, Charles of Hungary, would be passed over for succession of Naples. Instead, Robert would become heir apparent, after his elder brother Louis of Anjou (later Saint Louis of Toulouse) renounced his inheritance to take up holy orders. That same year, Naples and Aragon signed the Treaty of Anagni, in which James II of Aragon pledged to return the throne of Sicily to Charles II. As part of the treaty, Robert married James' daughter, Yolanda of Aragon, thereby tying the two former combatants together by marriage. The treaty, however, did not end the conflict; the Sicilian parliament refused to allow the House of Anjou to regain control of the island, and so elected James' brother, Frederick II, as king of Sicily.

Faced with stiff Sicilian resistance, in 1298 Robert and his new father-in-law James launched a major invasion of Sicily, in which Robert led the Angevin forces. After some initial successes, the invasion became bogged down in Sicily, and in 1299 his younger brother, Philip of Taranto, was captured by the Sicilians. The war ended in 1302 with the signing of the Peace of Caltabellotta; Robert and the Angevin dynasty lost Sicily forever, their rule limited to the south of peninsular Italy.

=== King of Naples ===
Charles II of Naples died in 1309, leaving Robert to inherit the throne of Naples. In addition to inheriting the throne, Robert - as the new Angevin king of Naples - was seen as the papal champion in Italy, as had been his father and grandfather; his reign being blessed from the papal enclave within Robert's Provence, by the French Pope Clement V, who made him papal vicar in Romagna and Tuscany, where Robert intervened in the war of factions in Florence, accepted the offered signiory of that city, but had to abandon it due to Clement's opposition.

The leader of the Guelph party in Italy, Robert opposed the sojourn of Emperor Henry VII in Italy (1311–13) and his occupation of Rome in 1312. After Henry's death, the Guelph reaction against the Ghibelline leaders in northern Italy, Matteo Visconti and Cangrande della Scala, made it seem for a time that Robert would become the arbiter of Italy. Already ruler of wide possessions in Piedmont, Robert's prestige increased further when in 1313 the pope named him Senator of Rome, and when he became Lord of Genoa (1318–34) and Brescia (1319) and from 1314 onwards held the resounding papal title of imperial vicar of all Italy, during the absence in Italy of the Holy Roman Emperor, vacante imperio.

In 1328 he fought another emperor who had ventured into Italy, Louis IV of Bavaria, and in 1330 forced John of Bohemia to quit northern Italy. Robert's hegemony in Italy was diminished only by the constant menace of the House of Barcelona, which controlled both Sicily and Aragon.

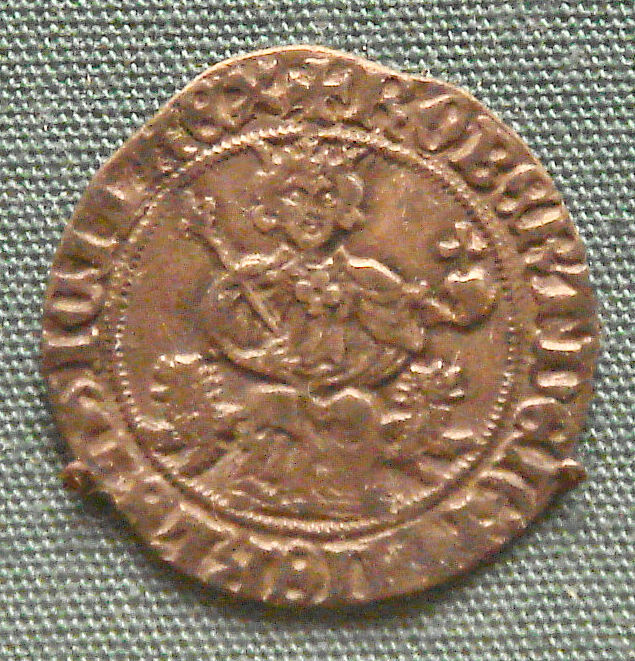
Silver gigliato of Robert I of Anjou King of Naples, 1309-1343.

When the succession to the margraviate of Saluzzo was disputed between Manfred V and his nephew Thomas II in 1336, Robert intervened on behalf of Manfred, for Thomas had married into the Ghibelline Visconti family. Robert advanced on Saluzzo and besieged it. He succeeded in taking it and sacking it, setting the city on fire and imprisoning Thomas, who had to pay a ransom. The whole dramatic incident is recorded by Silvio Pellico. However, when his viceroy Reforza d'Angoult was defeated in the Battle of Gamenario (22 April 1345), Angevin power in Piedmont began to crumble. With his second wife Sancha of Majorca, Robert established the kingdom of Naples as a center of early Renaissance culture and of religious dissent, supporting the Joachimite prophesies of the Spiritual Franciscans.

At Robert's death in 1343, he was succeeded by his 16-year-old granddaughter, Joanna I of Naples, his son Charles having predeceased him in 1328. Joanna was already betrothed to her cousin, the 15-year-old Andrew of Hungary, son of the Angevin king of Hungary, Charles Robert. In his last will and testament Robert explicitly excluded the claims of Andrew of Hungary, clearly mandated that he become prince of Salerno and specified that Joanna alone assume the crown in her own right, to be succeeded by her legitimate offspring. If she were to die without heir, her younger sister Maria, newly named the duchess of Calabria, and her legitimate offspring would inherit the throne. There is no mention in the will that Andrew be crowned king; and this historiographical tradition is largely the result of later historians' accepting without examination the assertions of Hungarian royal propaganda following Andrew's murder at Aversa in 1345. This propaganda, the Hungarian assault on Joanna following the murder of Andrew, and the invasion of the Regno by Louis I of Hungary eventually led to the end of Anjou-Naples rule in Naples.

== Legacy ==
King Robert was nicknamed "the peace-maker of Italy" due to the years of significant changes he brought to Naples. The city and nation's economy lay in the hands of Tuscan merchants, who erected superb buildings, monuments and statues that drastically changed King Robert's capital from a dirty seaport to a city of elegance and medieval splendor. Robert commissioned Tino di Camaino to produce a tomb for his son, who should have been his heir, and Giotto painted several works for him. The University of Naples flourished under the patronage of the king dismissed by Dante as a re di sermone, "king of words", attracting students from all parts of Italy. There was virtually no middle class in the South to balance the local interests and centripetal power of the entrenched aristocracy, who retained the feudal independence that had been their bargain with the Angevins' Norman predecessors.

Unusually, Robert preached sermons throughout his reign, at universities, religious houses, and on other ceremonial occasions, making use of an authoritative form of oratory ordinarily reserved for clerics. Records of hundreds of these sermons survive in extant manuscripts, providing an important case study in the history of medieval lay preaching.

He was remembered by Petrarch and Boccaccio as a cultured man and a generous patron of the arts, "unique among the kings of our day," Boccaccio claimed after Robert's death, "a friend of knowledge and virtue." Petrarch asked to be examined by Robert before being crowned as poet in the Campidoglio in Rome (1341); his Latin epic Africa is dedicated to Robert, though it was not made available to readers until 1397, long after both Petrarch and Robert were dead.

== Family ==
By his first wife, Yolanda, daughter of King Peter III of Aragon, Robert had two sons:

- Charles (1298–1328), Duke of Calabria (1309), Viceroy of Naples (1318), who was the father of Queen Joanna I
- Louis (1301–1310), died at the age of nine.

Robert's second marriage, to Sancia, daughter of King James II of Majorca, was childless. He had the following extramarital children:

- Charles d'Artois, member of the regency council and grand chamberlain for Queen Joanna I, executed for murder of King Andrew
- Maria d'Aquino (Boccaccio's Fiammetta)
- Hélène of Anjou, who fell in love with and married Andrea I Thopia, Count of Matia, without her father's consent. Hélène was possibly due to marry Bertrand de Baux, the Bailli of Morea, or the Prince of Morea, as part of a political alliance when this happened. Thopia's emblem contains three lilies separated by a dotted line, indicating an illegitimate child. Hélène and Andrea had Karl Thopia (likely named after Hélène's grandfather, Charles II of Naples) and Gjergj Thopia. The marriage was not accepted by Robert, who with the pretext of reconciliation, invited the couple to Naples, where he had them executed and decapitated.

King Robert's last descendant through a legitimate line was Queen Joanna II of Naples.

== Ancestry ==
Ancestors of Robert, King of Naples

8. Louis VIII of France
4. Charles I, Count of Anjou
9. Blanche of Castile
2. Charles II, Count of Anjou
10. Ramon Berenguer IV, Count of Provence
5. Beatrice of Provence
11. Beatrice of Savoy
1. Robert of Naples
12. Béla IV of Hungary
6. Stephen V of Hungary
13. Maria Laskarina
3. Mary of Hungary
14. Köten
7. Elizabeth the Cuman
15. Mstislawna

== Other sources ==
- Coat of arms of the House of Anjou-Sicily (in French)

== Sources ==
- Abulafia, David (2000). "The Italian south". In Jones, Michael (ed.). The New Cambridge Medieval History: c.1300-1415. Vol. VI. Cambridge University Press.
- Fleck, Cathleen A. (2016). The Clement Bible at the Medieval Courts of Naples and Avignon. Routledge.
- Hearder, H.; Waley, D.P., eds. (1963). A Short History of Italy. Cambridge University Press.
- Hoch, Adrian S. (1995). "The Franciscan Provenance of Simone Martini's Angevin St. Louis in Naples". Zeitschrift für Kunstgeschichte. 58. Bd., H. 1.
- Kelly, Samantha (2003). The new Solomon: Robert of Naples (1309-1343) and Fourteenth-Century Kingship. Brill.
- Musto, Ronald G. (2003). Apocalypse in Rome: Cola di Rienzo and the Politics of the New Age. University of California Press.
- Musto, Ronald G. (2013). Medieval Naples: A Documentary History, 400–1400. Italica Press.
- O'Connell, Monique; Dursteler, Eric R (2016). The Mediterranean World: From the Fall of Rome to the Rise of Napoleon. The Johns Hopkins University Press.
- Pryds, Darleen N. (2000). The King Embodies the Word : Robert d'Anjou and the Politics of Preaching. Leiden: Brill. ISBN 90-04-47482-X.

Robert, King of Naples Capetian House of Anjou Cadet branch of the Capetian dynasty Born: 1276 Died: 20 January 1343
Regnal titles
Preceded by Charles II	King of Naples; Count of Provence and Forcalquier; 1309–1343	Succeeded by Joanna I
