= Urošica =

Serbian prince and monk

Saint Urošica Урошица
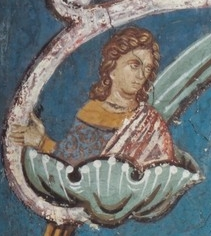
- Fresco in Serbian Orthodox; Visoki Dečani monastery

Myrrh-streaming
- Venerated in: Eastern Orthodox Church
- Member of the Nemanjić dynasty
- Native name: Стефан Урошица Немањић
- Church: Serbian Orthodox

Personal details
- Born: before 1285
- Died: before 1316
- Buried: Saint Achillius Church, Arilje (Serbia)
- Denomination: Eastern Christianity
- Parents: Stefan Dragutin and Catherine of Hungary
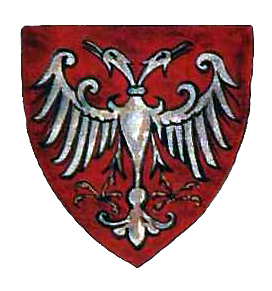
- Coat of arms: Urošica's coat of arms

Sainthood
- Feast day: November 11 [O.S. November 24]
- Canonized: before 1378 by Serbian Orthodox Church

Urošica (Serbian Cyrillic: Урошица; fl. 1285 – before 1316) was a Serbian prince and Orthodox monk, a member of the Nemanjić dynasty. He was the younger son of Stefan Dragutin, King of Serbia 1272–1282 and Syrmia 1282–1316. Dragutin kept Syrmia after passing the rule to Stefan Milutin in 1282. Through mother Catherine of the Hungarian Árpád dynasty, the elder son Stefan Vladislav II was the Duke of Slavonia from 1292 and the King of Syrmia from 1316 until 1325. Urošica took monastic vows as Stefan (Стефан), and is venerated as a saint by the Serbian Orthodox Church on November 11 [O.S. November 24].

== Life ==
=== Family and political background ===
Urošica was the youngest of three children of Serbian King Stefan Dragutin and his wife, Princess Catherine of Hungary.

There is a theory that Urošica and Urošic are two people.

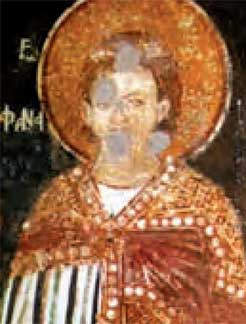
Urošica

Dragutin ruled from 1276 until he broke his leg while hunting and became ill in 1282, when the rule was passed to Dragutin's younger brother Stefan Milutin, while Dragutin kept Syrmia as King (1282–1316).

Ladislaus IV died in 1290 leaving no sons, and a civil war between rival candidates Andrew III of Hungary, and Charles Martel of Anjou started. Through mother Catherine of the Hungarian Árpád dynasty, brother Stefan Vladislav II received the duchy of Slavonia in 1292. In 1293, Vladislav married Constanza Morosini, a relative of Andrew III on his maternal side. Charles Martel was supported by Croatian nobleman Paul I Šubić of Bribir, who received the right to Gvozd and Neretva rivers after Charles had managed to assert his rule over parts of Croatia.

His sister Elizabeth married, some time after 1283, Stephen I, Ban of Bosnia (1287–1314), also a Hungarian vassal.

=== Monastic life ===
He took monastic vows with the name Stefan, a tradition of the Nemanjić dynasty. The Tavna Monastery on Majevica in Bosnia is thought to be the endowment of Urošica and his brother Vladislav. Some sources claim that the Papraća Monastery located by the Spreča river under the Borogovo mountain was an endowment of the brothers and their father Dragutin.

He died young as a monk sometime before 1316, and was buried in the Saint Achillius Church in Arilje (Serbia), the endowment of his father Dragutin (the church was painted in 1296). According to legend his relics were Myrrh-streaming, thus the Serbian Orthodox Church proclaimed him a saint, venerating him on November 11 [O.S. November 24]. Frescoes of him exist at Gračanica, Peć, Visoki Dečani, and Arilje in the narthex on the northern wall. None of the frescoes include the title "Saint".

In 1311, Dragutin launched a campaign to seize the throne to his son; this is thought to have meant Vladislav (although Archbishop Danilo II said Urošic was the possible heir).

Based on various sources, he is said to be the father of Caesar Vojihna, one of the most acclaimed military commanders of Serbian Empire.

== Ancestry ==
Ancestors of Urošica

16. Stefan Nemanja, Grand Prince of Serbia
8. Stefan Nemanjić, Grand Prince/ King of Serbia
17. Anastasija, Queen consort of Serbia
4. Stephen Uroš I of Serbia, King of Serbia
9. Anna Dandolo, Queen consort of Serbia
2. Stefan Dragutin, King of Serbia
20. Isaac II Angelos
10. John (Iōannēs) Angelos
21. Margaret of Hungary
5. Helen of Anjou, Queen consort of Serbia
11. Mathilde of Vianden
1. Urošica
24. Andrew II of Hungary
12. Béla IV, King of Hungary
25. Gertrude of Merania
6. Stephen V, King of Hungary
26. Theodore I Laskaris
13. Maria Laskarina, Queen consort of Hungary
27. Anna Angelina
3. Catherine of Hungary, Queen consort of Serbia
14. Köten, Khan of Cumans
7. Elizabeth the Cuman, Queen consort of Hungary

== Annotations ==
1. Name: His given name was Urošica or Urošic (Урошиц/a), a diminutive of the name Uroš (with suffix -ica, literally "Little Uroš", after grandfather Stephen Uroš I of Serbia). He took monastic vows with the name Stefan; a tradition of the Nemanjić dynasty used since Stefan Nemanja until the last ruler. He was proclaimed a saint by the Serbian Church, and is referred to as "Saint Urošica" (Св. Урошица).
