= Realm of Stefan Dragutin =

Medieval Serbian kingdom

Realm of Stefan Dragutin Област Стефана Драгутина Oblast Stefana Dragutina
- 1282–1325
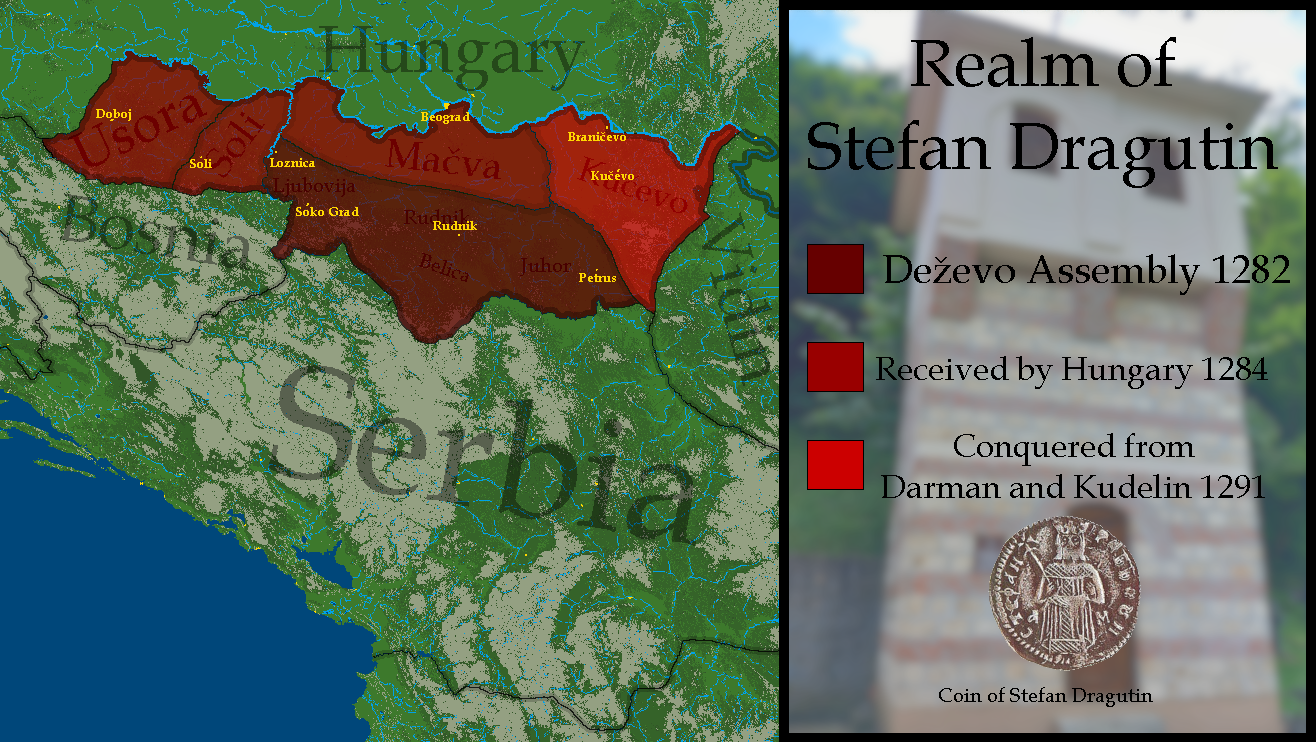
- Kingdom of Syrmia of Stefan Dragutin (1291-1316)
- Status: initially vassal kingdom of the Kingdom of Hungary, later an independent kingdom
- Capital: Debrc and Belgrade
- Government: Hereditary monarchy
- Historical era: Middle Ages
  - Established: 1282
  - Disestablished: 1325
Preceded by
Banate of Macsó
Banate of Ózora
Banate of Só
Realm of Darman and Kudelin
Kingdom of Serbia (medieval)
Succeeded by
Banate of Macsó
Banate of Bosnia
Kingdom of Serbia (medieval)
- Today part of: Serbia, Bosnia and Herzegovina, Croatia

The Realm of Stefan Dragutin (Serbian: Област Стефана Драгутина, romanized: Oblast Stefana Dragutina) was a medieval Serbian kingdom. Initially, it was a vassal kingdom of the Kingdom of Hungary, but subsequently became an independent kingdom, after the collapse of the central power in the Kingdom of Hungary. It was ruled by the Serbian kings Stefan Dragutin (1282–1316) and his son Stefan Vladislav II (1316–1325). The kingdom was centered in the region of Lower Syrmia (today known as Mačva) and its first capital was Debrc (between Belgrade and Šabac), while residence of the king was later moved to Belgrade.

== Territory ==
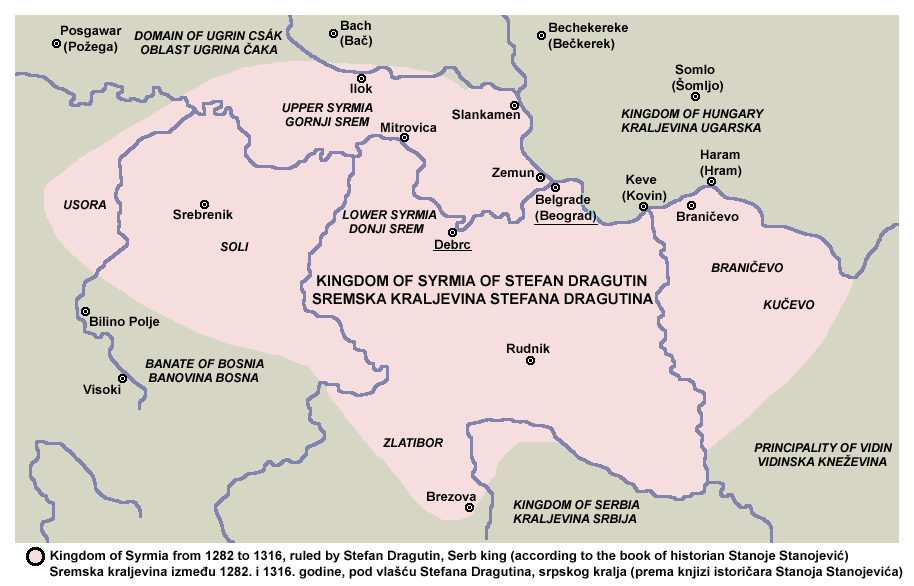
Kingdom of Syrmia of Stefan Dragutin with borders that are including Upper Syrmia (according to Serbian historian Stanoje Stanojević)

In the Middle Ages, "Syrmia" was the name for a larger area around the river Sava. The part in the north of Sava was known as Upper Syrmia (present-day Syrmia), while the area south of the river was known as Lower Syrmia (present-day Mačva). The kingdom was centered in Mačva, but also included Belgrade, part of Šumadija with Rudnik, and the župas (counties) of Podrinje, Usora, Soli, Braničevo and Kučevo. According to several Serbian historians (Dejan Mikavica, Stanoje Stanojević, Aleksa Ivić, Milojko Brusin, etc.), the kingdom also included Upper Syrmia (modern Syrmia).

== History ==
Stefan Dragutin was initially the king of Serbia from 1276 to 1282. In 1282, he broke his leg while hunting and became ill; he passed the throne to his younger brother Stefan Milutin at the council at Deževo in 1282, while keeping for himself some northern parts of the country (Rudnik and parts of the župa of Podrinje). Since his son Vladislav married a relative of the Hungarian king, Dragutin in 1284 gained from Ladislaus IV the banates of Só (Soli), Ózora (Usora) and Macsó (Mačva) with Belgrade. He first ruled them as a Hungarian vassal, until the collapse of the central power of the Hungarian Kingdom. The first capital of his state was Debrc, and later he moved his residence to Belgrade. Dragutin was the first Serbian ruler to use Belgrade as his capital.

Around 1291 and with the help of Milutin, Dragutin expanded his territory by annexing the regions of Braničevo and Kučevo, whose former rulers Darman and Kudelin had recently become independent from the Kingdom of Hungary. For the first time, these regions became part of the Serbian state. This action probably caused the war between the Bulgarian despot Shishman of Vidin and Milutin.

Towards the end of his life, Stefan Dragutin broke away from his Hungarian allies and strengthened his ties with Serbia. He later took monastic vows, died in 1316 and was buried in the monastery of Đurđevi stupovi, near present-day Novi Pazar.

After the death of Dragutin, his son Vladislav assumed his father's appanage. However, in 1319, the Serbian king Milutin, Vladislav's uncle, invaded, defeated and imprisoned the latter. When Milutin died in 1321, the newly freed Vladislav recovered his father's lands, with the help of the Hungarians and of his nephew Stephen II, the ban of Bosnia.

After being defeated again by supporters of Milutin's son and successor, Stefan Dečanski, Vladislav retreated to the Kingdom of Hungary in 1324. Later, Stephen II reincorporated Soli and Usora into Bosnia. Belgrade and the northern part of the banate of Mačva along the river Sava remained under the rule of the Kingdom of Hungary, while Braničevo and the southern part of Mačva remained Serbian. The kingdoms of Serbia and Hungary would contest Mačva for the next century.

== Rulers ==
Monarch	Reign
Stefan Dragutin	1282–1316
Vladislav	1316–1325

== Annotations ==
1. The state was called "the Syrmian Land" (Serbian: Сремска земља / Sremska zemlja) or "Syrmian Lands" (Serbian: Сремске земље / Sremske zemlje). Serbian Archbishop Danilo II (s. 1324–37) called it the "state in the Syrmian land". Ragusan chronicler Mavro Orbini (1563–1614) called it the "Land of King Stefan" (Italian: terra del Rè Stefano, Serbian: Земља краља Стефана / Zemlja kralja Stefana). Scarcer historiographical names include "Dragutin's State" (Serbian: Драгутинова држава / Dragutinova država).
2. Vladislav's mother was the daughter of former Hungarian King Stephen V. Vladislav's wife was the aunt of former Hungarian King Andrew III. Ban Stephen II was the son of Vladislav's sister.

== Sources ==
- Bataković, Dušan T., ed. (2005). Histoire du peuple serbe [History of the Serbian People] (in French). Lausanne: L’Age d’Homme. ISBN 9782825119587.
- Ćirković, Sima (2004). The Serbs. Malden: Blackwell Publishing. ISBN 9781405142915.
- Ћирковић, Сима; Михаљчић, Раде, eds. (1999). Лексикон српског средњег века (The Lexicon of Serbian Middle Ages). Београд: Knowledge. ISBN 9788683233014.
- Dinić, Mihailo (1978). Српске земље у средњем веку: историјско-географске студије. Српска књижевна задруга.
- Engel, Pál (2001). The Realm of St. Stephen: A History of Medieval Hungary, 895-1526. London & New York: I.B.Tauris. ISBN 9781850439776.
- Fine, John V. A. Jr. (1994) [1987]. The Late Medieval Balkans: A Critical Survey from the Late Twelfth Century to the Ottoman Conquest. Ann Arbor, Michigan: University of Michigan Press. ISBN 978-0-472-10079-8. OCLC 749133662.
- Jireček, Constantin (1911). Geschichte der Serben. Vol. 1. Gotha: Perthes.
- Krstić, Aleksandar R. (2016). "The Rival and the Vassal of Charles Robert of Anjou: King Vladislav II Nemanjić". Banatica. 26 (2): 33–51.
- Mrgić, Jelena; Živković, Tibor (2008). Северна Босна: 13-16. век. Историјски институт. ISBN 9788677430719.
- Orbini, Mauro (1601). Il Regno de gli Slavi hoggi corrottamente detti Schiavoni. Pesaro: Apresso Girolamo Concordia.
- Орбин, Мавро (1968). Краљевство Словена. Београд: Српска књижевна задруга.
- Vásáry, István (2005). Cumans and Tatars: Oriental Military in the Pre-Ottoman Balkans, 1185–1365. Cambridge: Cambridge University Press. ISBN 9781139444088.
