= Catherine of Hungary, Queen of Serbia =

Catherine
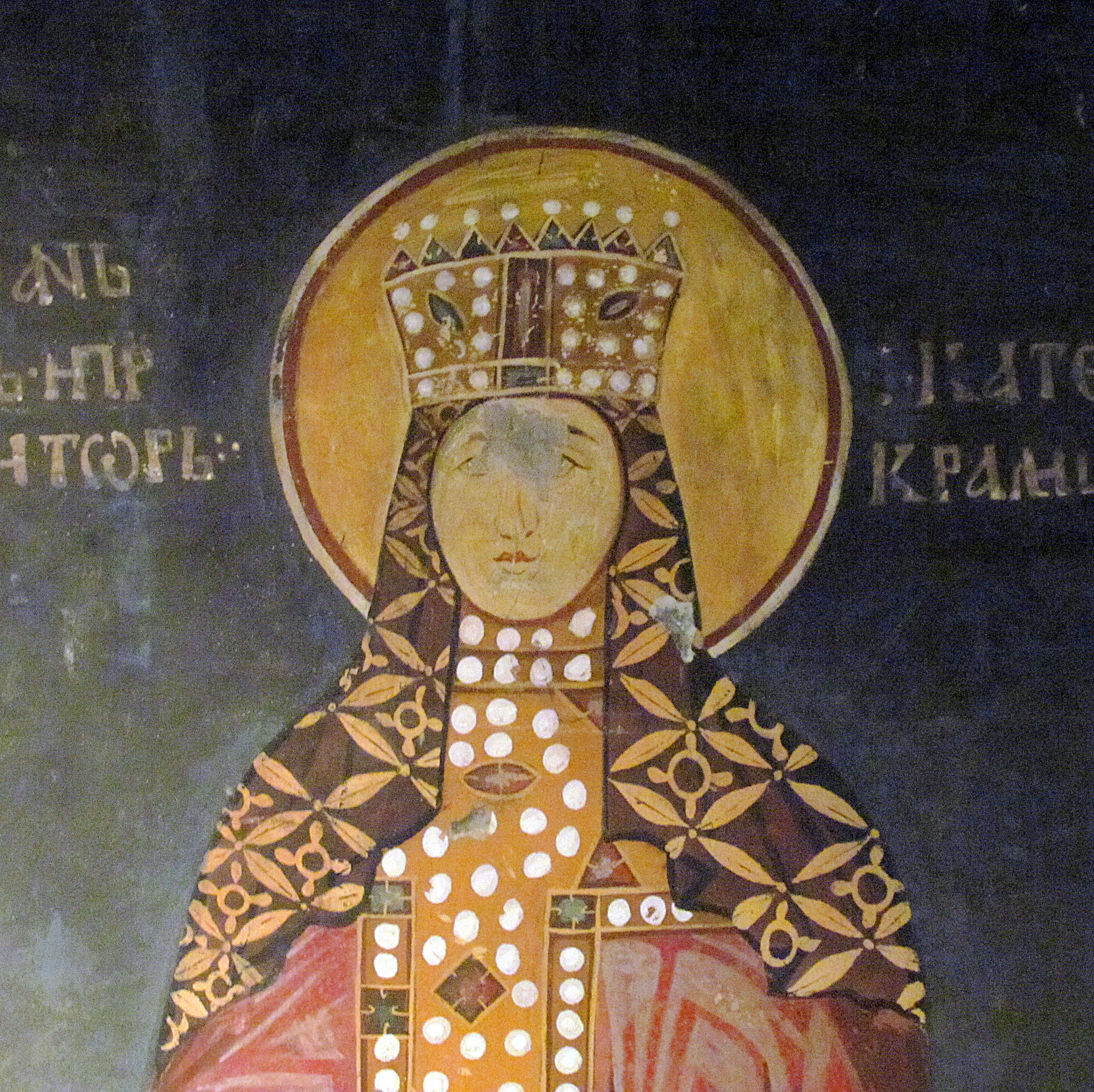

Queen consort of Serbia
- Tenure: 1276–1282
- Spouse: Stefan Dragutin
- Issue: Stefan Vladislav II; Elizabeth, Baness of Bosnia; Urošica
- House: Arpad
- Father: Stephen V of Hungary
- Mother: Elizabeth the Cuman

Catherine of Hungary (Hungarian: Katalin, Serbian: Каталина, romanized: Katalina; c. 1256 – after 1314) was a Queen consort of Serbia by her marriage to Stefan Dragutin. Catherine was the second daughter of Stephen V of Hungary and his wife Elizabeth, daughter of Seyhan, chieftain of the Cumans.

== Family ==
Catherine was the second of six children. Her sister Elizabeth also became a Queen of Serbia, by her marriage to Stephen Dragutin's brother, Stefan Milutin. Catherine's brother was Ladislaus IV of Hungary.

Catherine's paternal grandparents were Béla IV of Hungary and his wife Maria Laskarina.

== Queenship ==
The efforts of Catherine's grandfather, Bela IV of Hungary to secure his southern boundary while moving toward the Adriatic included establishing leaders in Srem (John Angelos) and Slavonia (Rostislav Mikhailovich) who were not only capable but also closely connected to the royal family. It is quite reasonable that an effective way to at least neutralize Serbia under Uroš would be to connect him through dynastic marriage to Hungarian nobility, whether by diplomacy or force. Such use of dynastic marriage occurred, for example, in 1268 when Stephen Uroš I of Serbia unsuccessfully attempted to conquer Macva (Macsó). The result was the marriage of Catherine to his son Stephen Dragutin of Serbia in c.1268. A detailed reexamination of the relations between Hungary and Serbia in the period 1240-1265, and especially around 1250, would be expected to show that the marriage of Helen of Anjou and Stephen Uros was a natural outcome of political factors. Such a study would also aid in illuminating later developments in Hungarian-Serbian relations.

For example, it is well known that Dragutin was given Mačva, Usora and Soli by his brother-in-law Ladislas IV of Hungary after yielding the Serbian throne to his brother Milutin in 1282. It has been assumed that he was known as King of Srem because these territories south of the Sava included those which at one time were called Sirmia ulterior by the Hungarians, even though only Sirmia citerior between the Sava and Danube was normally known as Srem. Dragutin received many of these lands due to his marriage to Catherine.

Catherine's children were heirs to the throne of Hungary when Catherine's brother Ladislaus died childless, after neglecting his wife, Elizabeth of Sicily, for the sake of their Cuman family. However, Catherine's children did not inherit Hungary, her distant cousin, Andrew III of Hungary inherited instead, though his claim was in question because other European monarchs believed that Hungary was in their possession. However, Catherine's son Stefan Vladislav II of Syrmia was always a pretender to Hungary even after the death of Andrew III in 1301. Catherine and her son were in competition with her nephews. Catherine's nephew, Charles Martel of Anjou gave them the province of Slavonia even though it did not belong to him.

A Byzantine envoy who visited the Serbian court about 1268 to participate in ultimately failed negotiations for a marriage alliance wrote of the conditions at court disparagingly:

The Great King [Uroš] as he is called, lives a simple life in such a way that would be a disgrace for a middling official in Constantinople; the king's Hungarian daughter-in-law [Katalin] works at her spinning wheel in a cheap dress; the household eats like a pack of hunters or sheep-stealers.

Near the end of his life, Catherine's husband separated from his Hungarian friends, gained from their marriage and strengthened his connections in Serbia. He later became a monk and changed his name to Teoktist. He died in 1316 and was buried in the Đurđevi Stupovi monastery near Novi Pazar.

Catherine herself died sometime after 1316, others are not sure when she died.

== Issue ==
Catherine and Stefan Dragutin had three children:

- Stefan Vladislav II
- Elizabeth of Serbia
- Urošica, monk.

== Sources ==
- Bataković, Dušan T., ed. (2005). Histoire du peuple serbe [History of the Serbian People] (in French). Lausanne: L’Age d’Homme. ISBN 9782825119587.
- Bataković, Dušan T., ed. (2005). Histoire du peuple serbe [History of the Serbian People] (in French). Lausanne: L’Age d’Homme. ISBN 9782825119587.
- Ćirković, Sima (2004). The Serbs. Malden: Blackwell Publishing. ISBN 9781405142915.
- Engel, Pál (2001). The Realm of St. Stephen: A History of Medieval Hungary, 895-1526. London & New York: I.B.Tauris. ISBN 9781850439776.
- Fine, John Van Antwerp Jr. (1994) [1987]. The Late Medieval Balkans: A Critical Survey from the Late Twelfth Century to the Ottoman Conquest. Ann Arbor, Michigan: University of Michigan Press. ISBN 0472082604.
- Krstić, Aleksandar R. (2016). "The Rival and the Vassal of Charles Robert of Anjou: King Vladislav II Nemanjić". Banatica. 26 (2): 33–51.
- Živković, Vojislav (2021). Serbian Kings Dragutin and Milutin. The Problem of the Succession of the Serbian Throne at the End of the 13th and Beginning of the 14th Century. Niš & Vranje: Centar za crkvene studije; Svepravoslavno društvo Prepodobni Justin Ćelijski i Vranjski. ISBN 978-86-84105-59-4.
- Živković, Vojislav (2022). "Reconstruction of the Biography of Catherine of Hungaru, Queen of Serbia". Arheon. Časopis Arhiva Vojvodine 5 (in Serbian): 177–192.
- Živković, Vojislav (2022a). "Hungarian Princess Jelisaveta Arpad". Седам векова од упокојења Светог краља Милутина - тематски зборник. ур. Влада Станковић, Драгољуб Марјановић. Врање: Свеправославно друштво "Преподобни Јустин Ћелијски и Врањски" (in Serbian): 110–124.

Royal titles
Preceded by Helen of Anjou	Queen consort of Serbia; 1276–1282	Vacant Title next held by Helena Doukaina Angelina
