= Andrew, Duke of Slavonia =

Andrew

Duke of Slavonia
- Reign: 1274–1278
- Predecessor: Béla (last)
- Successor: Andrew (self-styled)
- Born: 1268
- Died: April/November 1278 (aged 9–10)
- Dynasty: Árpád
- Father: Stephen V of Hungary
- Mother: Elizabeth the Cuman

Andrew, Duke of Slavonia (Hungarian: András szlavóniai herceg; 1268–1278) was the youngest son of King Stephen V of Hungary and his wife, Elizabeth the Cuman. Two rebellious lords kidnapped him in 1274 in an attempt to play him off against his brother, Ladislaus IV of Hungary, but the king's supporters liberated him. He was styled "Duke of Slavonia and Croatia" in a 1274 letter. Years after his death (in 1290 and in 1317), two adventurers claimed to be identical with Andrew, but both failed.

== Family ==
Andrew was born in 1268. He was the second son (and youngest child) of Stephen V, the junior king of Hungary at the time of Andrew's birth. The senior king was Andrew's grandfather Béla IV. Andrew's mother was Stephen's wife, Elizabeth the Cuman.

Andrew's father, Stephen, became the sole King of Hungary in 1270, but died two years later. Stephen was succeeded by his elder son (Andrew's ten-year-old brother) Ladislaus IV. In theory, Ladislaus's ruled under the regency of his mother, Elizabeth, but in fact, competing parties of the most wealthy noble families, including the Csáks and Kőszegis, were fighting against each other for the control of government.

== Duke of Slavonia ==
Henry Kőszegi, the Ban of Slavonia, and his ally, Joachim Gutkeled, the Master of the treasury, who had earlier held Ladislaus IV in captivity, kidnapped the six-year-old Andrew in July 1274, taking him to Slavonia in an attempt to play him off against his brother. However, Kőszegi's and Gutkeled's rival, Peter Csák, and his allies annihilated their united troops in late September and liberated Andrew. In a letter dated to the end of 1274, Andrew is mentioned as "Duke of Slavonia and Croatia", but otherwise he was only referred to as "Duke Andrew". According to a scholarly theory, the former title was only used to emphasize that Andrew was the lawful heir to his 12-year-old elder brother at the time the letter, which referred to a planned marriage between Andrew and a relative of Rudolf I of Germany, was written. Andrew died at the age of ten between 6 April and 6 November 1278.

== Two false Andrews ==
Andrew's childless brother, Ladislaus IV was murdered on 10 July 1290. His distant relative, Andrew III, succeeded him and was crowned king on 23 July. However, an adventurer announced that he was identical with King Ladislaus's younger brother, claiming Hungary to himself against Andrew III. Through showing his specific birthmark, the impostor even convinced Stephen V's sister – the late Duke Andrew's aunt – Kinga, wife of Bolesław V the Chaste, Duke of Cracow. The false Duke Andrew invaded Hungary from Poland, but King Andrew's commander, George Baksa routed his troop, forcing him to return to Poland before 18 November. The pretender was in short killed by his Hungarian retainers.

In 1317, a new adventurer declared himself Duke Andrew, on this occasion in Majorca. He and his imprisonment was mentioned in the correspondence between Sancho, King of Majorca, and Robert, King of Naples who was the uncle of Charles I of Hungary. The second false Duke Andrew's further fate is unknown.

== Sources ==
- Engel, Pál (2001). The Realm of St Stephen: A History of Medieval Hungary, 895–1526. I.B. Tauris Publishers. ISBN 1-86064-061-3.
- Érszegi, Géza; Solymosi, László (1981). "Az Árpádok királysága, 1000–1301 [The Monarchy of the Árpáds, 1000–1301]". In Solymosi, László (ed.). Magyarország történeti kronológiája, I: a kezdetektől 1526-ig [Historical Chronology of Hungary, Volume I: From the Beginning to 1526] (in Hungarian). Akadémiai Kiadó. pp. 79–187. ISBN 963-05-2661-1.
- Kristó, Gyula; Makk, Ferenc (1996). Az Árpád-ház uralkodói [Rulers of the House of Árpád] (in Hungarian). I.P.C. Könyvek. ISBN 963-7930-97-3.
- Zsoldos, Attila (2007). Családi ügy: IV. Béla és István ifjabb király viszálya az 1260-as években [A family affair: The Conflict between Béla IV and Junior King Stephen in the 1260s] (in Hungarian). História, MTA Történettudományi Intézete. ISBN 978-963-9627-15-4.
- Zsoldos, Attila (2015). "Meghal a király: Árpád-házi rémhistóriák" [The King dies: horror stories of the Árpád dynasty]. Múlt-kor (in Hungarian) (Nyár (Summer)): 49–53. ISSN 2061-3563.
