= Debrc =

Debrc Дебрц
- Village (Selo)
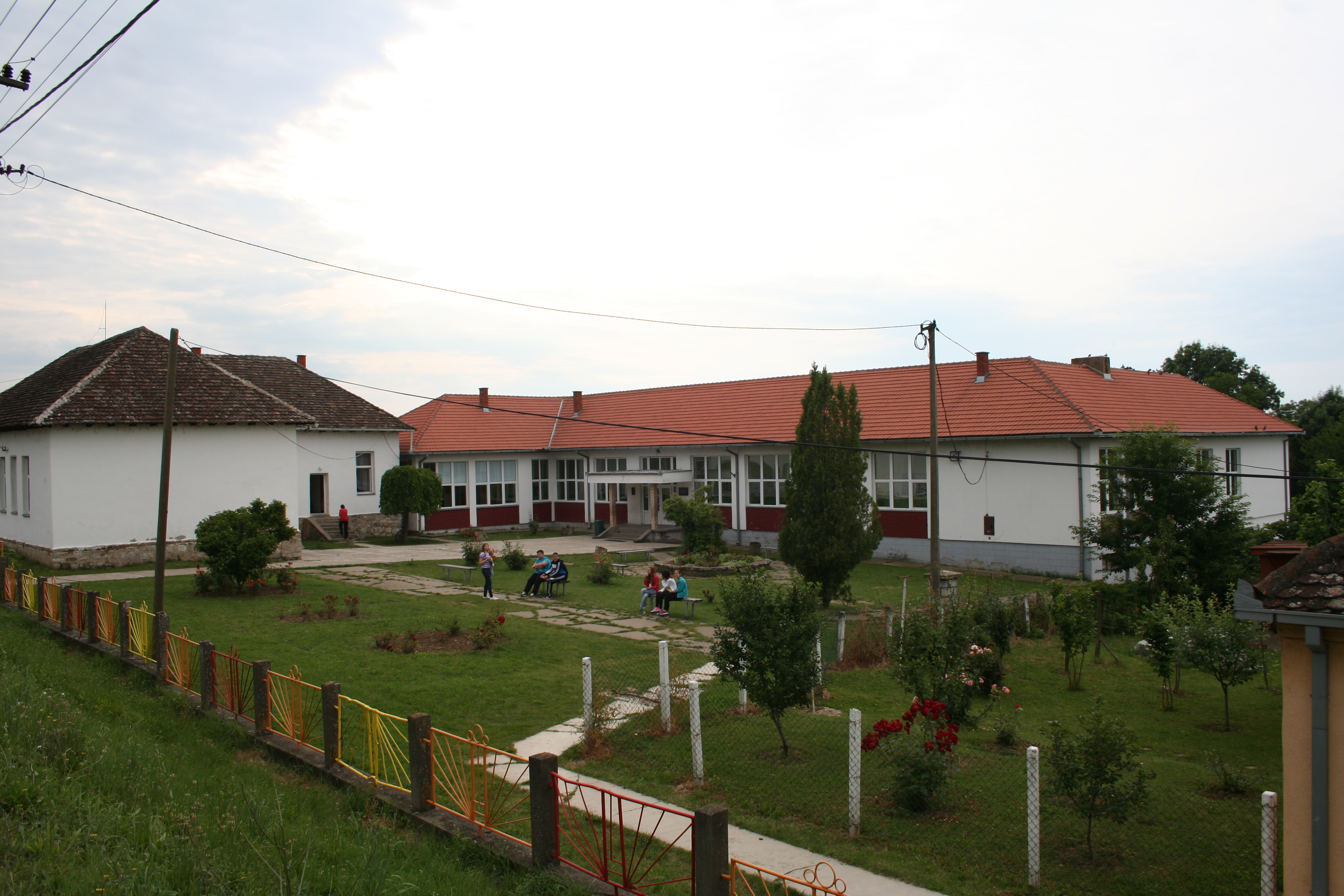

- Location within Serbia
- Coordinates: 44°37′14″N 19°54′07″E
- Country: Serbia
- District: Mačva
- Municipality: Vladimirci
- Elevation -above sea level: 140 m (460 ft)

Population (2011 census)
  - Total: 858
- Total listed population
- Time zone: UTC+1 (CET)
  - Summer (DST): UTC+2 (CEST)
- Postal code: 15214
- Area code: +381 15
- Vehicle registration plate: ŠA

Debrc (Serbian Cyrillic: Дебрц) is a former town, today a village, located in the Vladimirci municipality in Mačva District of Serbia. According to the census from 2011 there were 858 people listed in the village (according to the previous censuses number of inhabitants was somewhat larger: 875 in 2002, and 890 in 1991).

== Name ==
Name of the settlement originates from the Middle Ages, when a castle of Serb king Stefan Dragutin was located in this settlement. In the Hungarian language, the settlement was known as Debrecen. There is also a city in Hungary with same name (see: Debrecen) and the names of both places are of Slavic origin.

== History ==
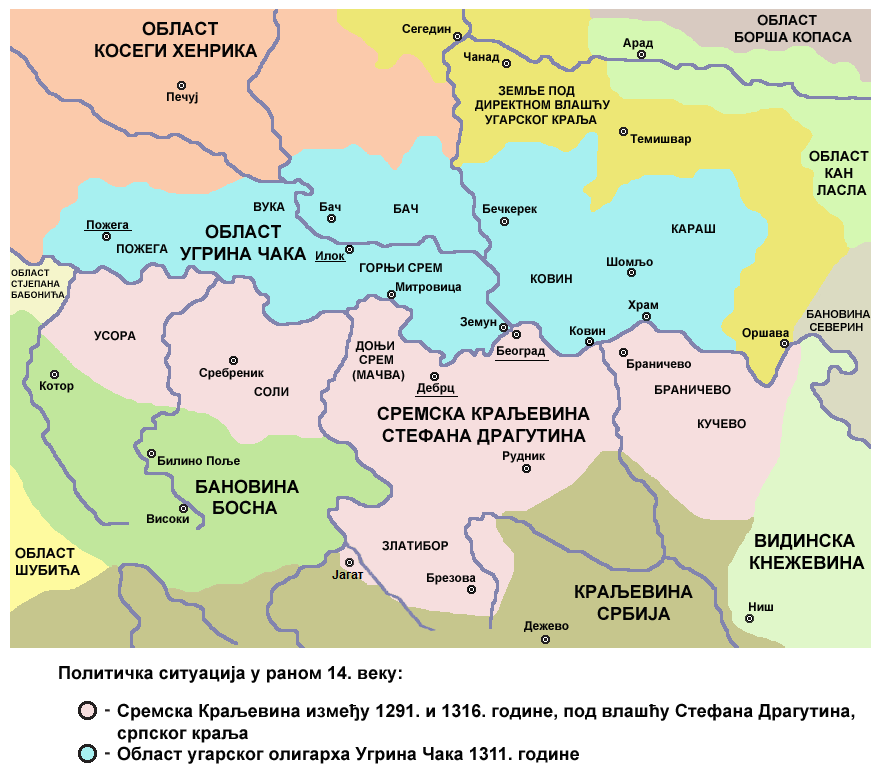
Realm of Stefan Dragutin centered in Debrc, 13th century

During the rule of Serb king Stephen Dragutin (end of the 13th century), Debrc was the capital of his realm between 1276 and 1283.

Afterwards, the area of Mačva became disputed between the Serbian states and the Kingdom of Hungary. Debrc was part of several Serbian states (the Serbian Empire, the State of Nikola Altomanović, the Moravian Serbia, and the Serbian Despotate), before been conquered by the Ottoman Empire. In 1718–1739, it was part of the Habsburg Kingdom of Serbia, but was again conquered by the Ottomans in 1739. Since 1804, Debrc is part of modern Serbian state.

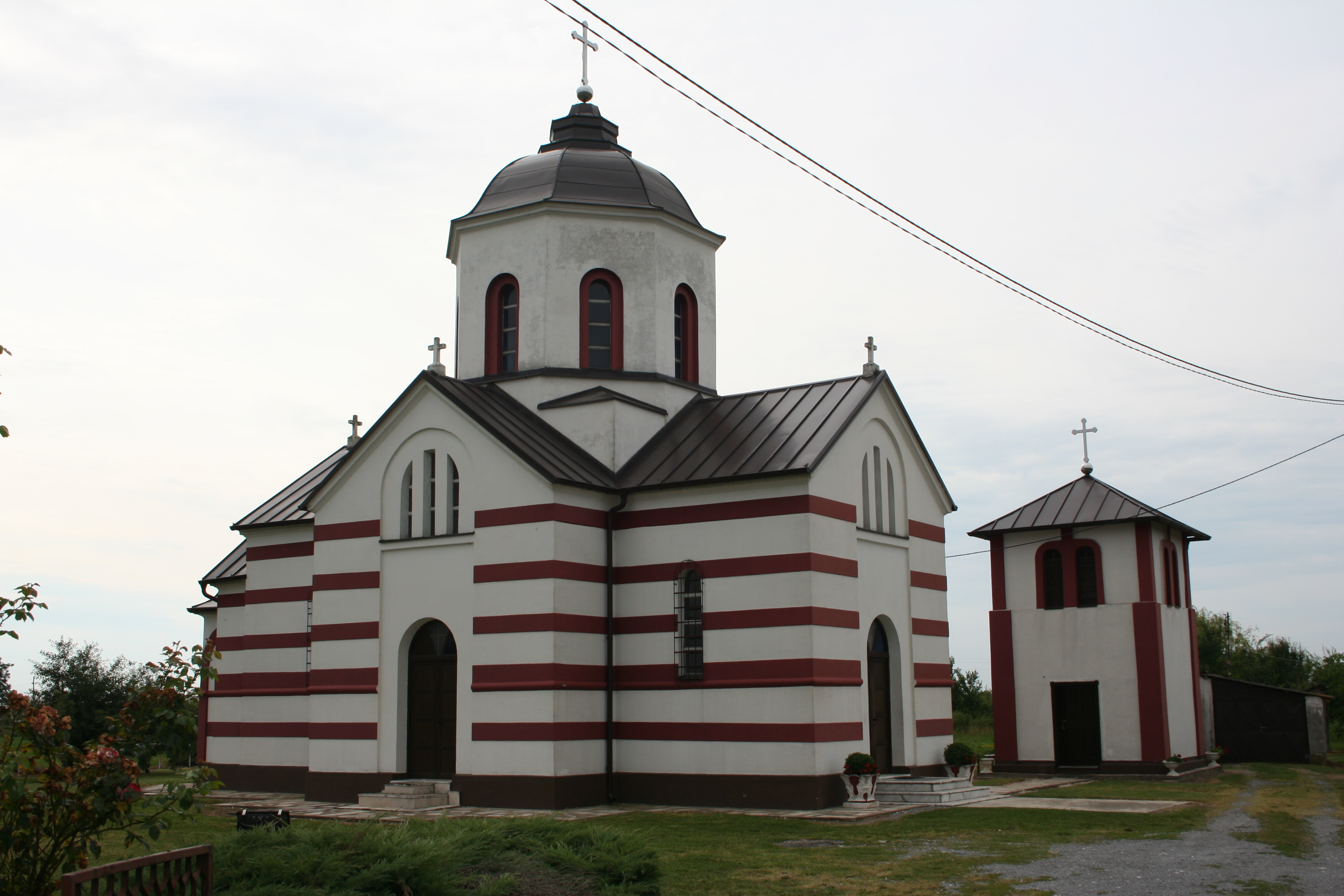
Orthodox Church Saint Constantine and Helena

In 1892 the town established a modern school named Jovan Cvijic. The school building was constructed in 1910. In 1939, Orthodox Church Saint Constantine and Helena were built.

== Features ==
The community Debrc is one of the largest and most important in the municipality of Vladimirci. In this community there are many significant infrastructure facilities for the life of its citizens, such as: local office, health center with pharmacy, eight-year school with a gymnasium and a modern library, nursery, veterinary stations, etc.

== See also ==
- List of places in Serbia
