= Papraća Monastery =

Serbian Orthodox monastery in Papraća, Bosnia and Herzegovina

Coordinates: 44.335533°N 18.948604°E

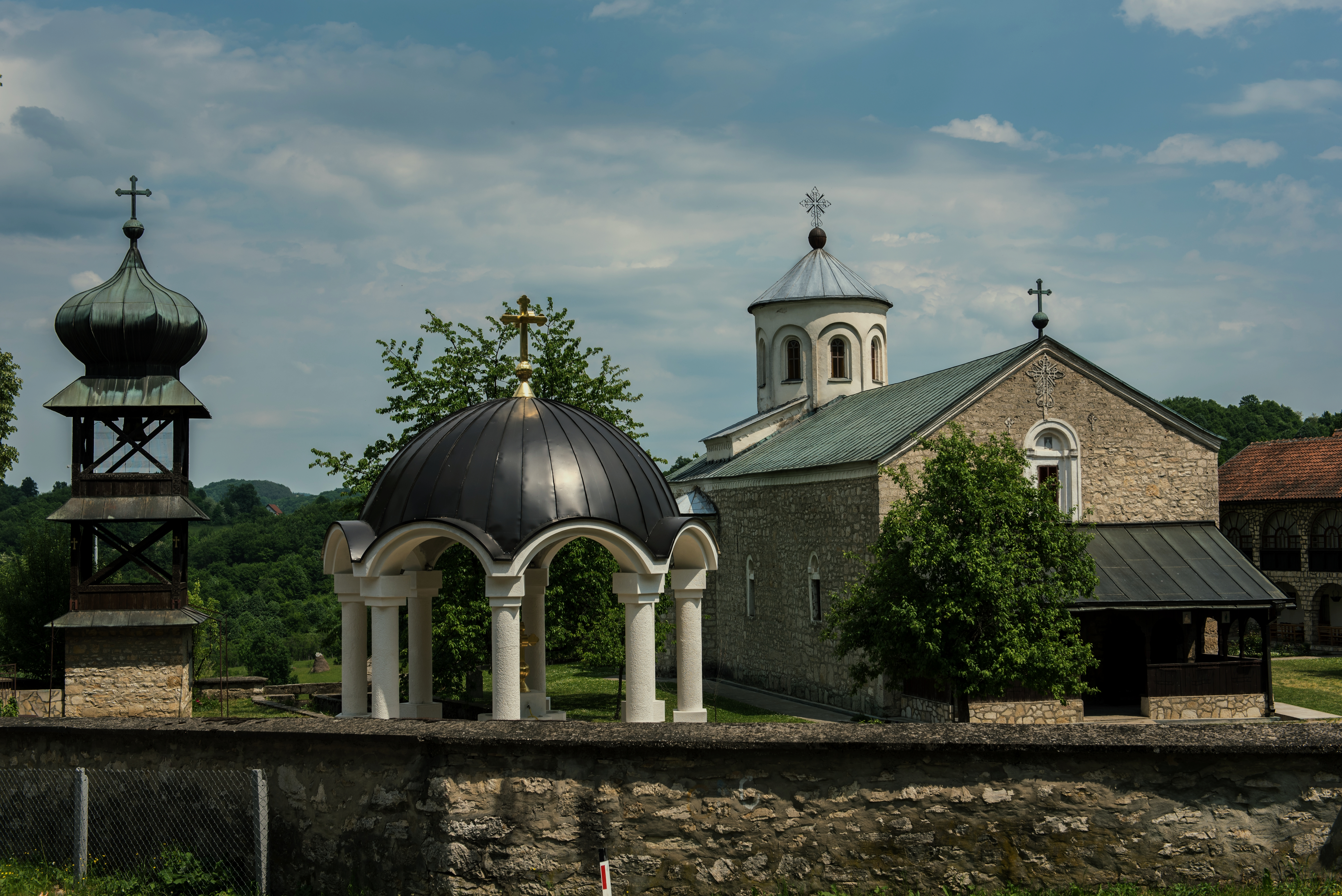
Monastery of Papraća

The Papraća Monastery (Serbian: Манастир Папраћа, romanized: Manastir Papraća) is a Serbian Orthodox monastery dedicated to the Annunciation and located in the village of Papraća at the source of the same-named river, near Šekovići in eastern Republika Srpska, Bosnia and Herzegovina. The date of its foundation is unknown, but contemporary Ottoman documents give evidence that the monastery already existed in the first half of the 16th century. While the remains of an older church which is assumed to originate from the period of Nemanjić's rule from 13th century have been excavated under the floor of the existing monastery.

The monks of Papraća had contacts with Russian rulers in the 16th and 17th centuries, and they often travelled to Russia to raise funds and donations. In 1551, the monks travelled to Moscow through Volhynia in the Grand Duchy of Lithuania, where they received a manuscript Gospel Book from Prince Dymitr Sanguszko, who was a grandson of Serbian Despot Jovan Branković. Several years later, also in Volhynia, another group of Papraća monks received a psalter from a man named Nikola the Serb. In 1559, Papraća monks helped build a new church at the Tronoša Monastery in western Serbia. In 1645, Russian Tsar Aleksey Mikhailovich granted a charter permitting the monks of Papraća to collect donations in Russia once every eight years. They managed to travel to Russia even during the Great Turkish War (1683–1699).

The monastery was abandoned and ruined after the Austro-Turkish War of 1716–18. Its church was rebuilt in 1853, after the construction works were allowed by Ottoman authorities. The rebuilding was helped by funds from Serbs of Sarajevo. The church was further refurbished in the following years, and it was consecrated in 1869. Monastic life was restored in Papraća in 1880. During World War II, the monastery was ruined and its valuables were stolen. It was partially repaired in 1954, mostly through efforts by nun Varvara Božić from the Tavna Monastery. After further renovations, it was consecrated on 21 September 1975. The Papraća Monastery was designated as a National Monument of Bosnia and Herzegovina by KONS in 2005.

== See also ==
- List of Serbian Orthodox monasteries
