= Tavna Monastery =

Serbian Orthodox monastery near Bijeljina, Bosnia and Herzegovina

Coordinates: 44°36′50″N 19°06′23″E

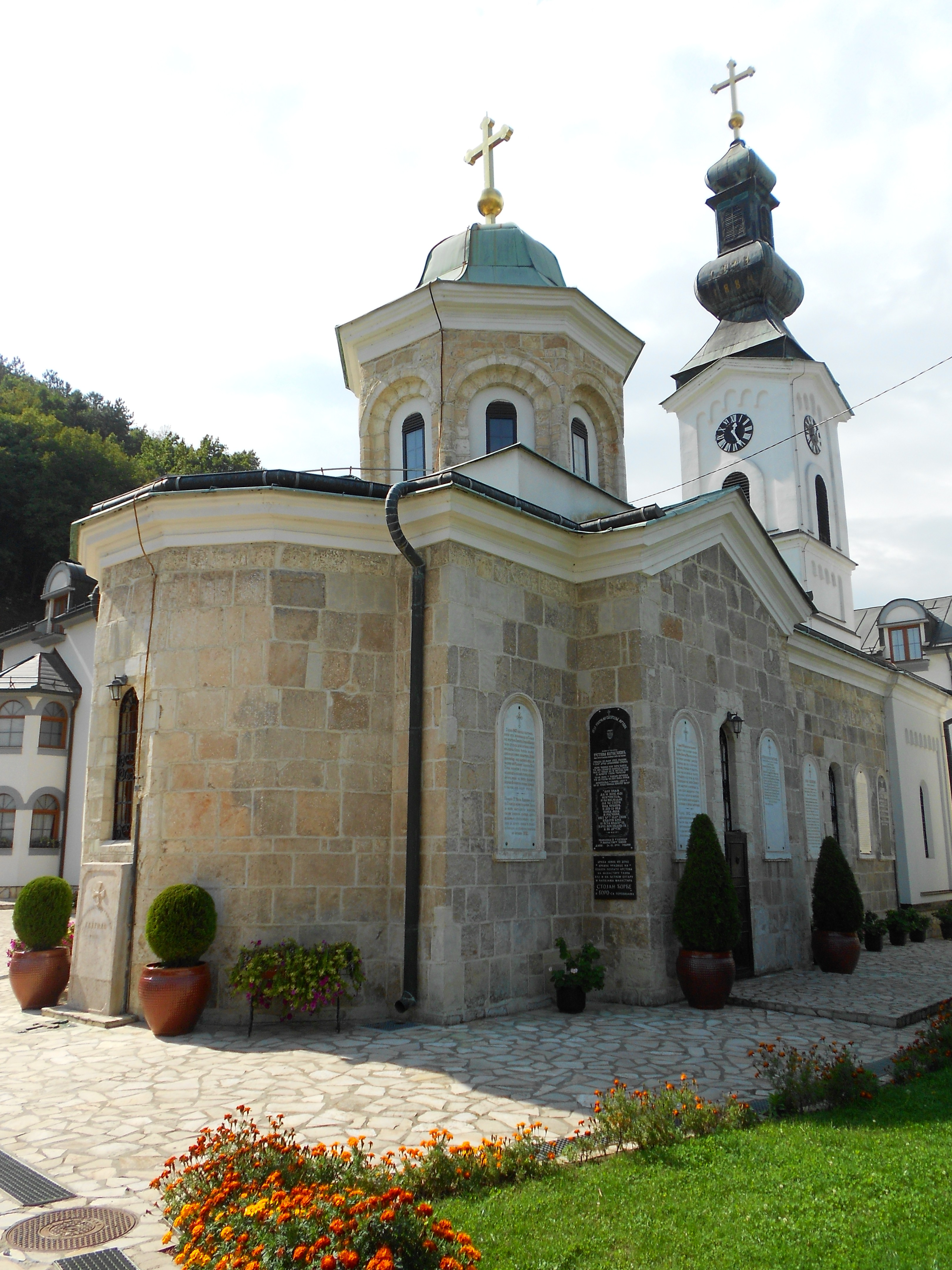
Tavna Monastery

The Tavna Monastery (Serbian: Манастир Тавна, romanized: Manastir Tavna) is a Serbian Orthodox monastery located south of the city of Bijeljina in north-eastern Republika Srpska, Bosnia and Herzegovina. The date of its foundation is unknown.

The chronicles of monasteries Tronoša and Peć say it was built by King Stefan Dragutin's sons Vladislav and Urošica. The present monastery church is built in the same place as the original one.

Tavna was damaged in the first years of Ottoman rule, but was restored by the people. This was not the only time the monastery was damaged. It was damaged many times during the Ottoman period and also during World War II. Between 1941-45 Tavna was bombed by the Nazi-affiliated Croat Ustashe but was reconstructed after the war.

== See also ==
- List of Serbian Orthodox monasteries
