= Stefan Vladislav II =

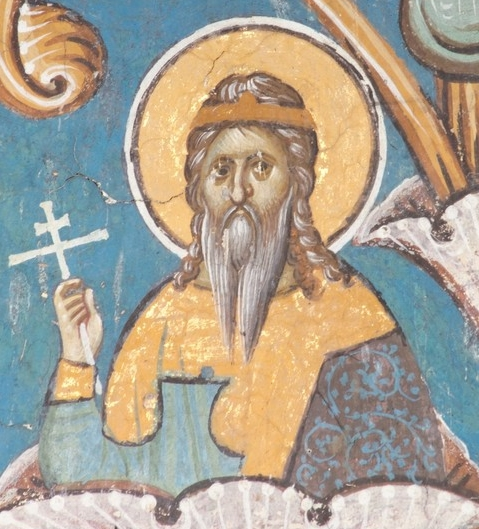
- Vladislav at Dečani (frescoes finished in 1350).

King-pretender of Serbia and Lord of Syrmia
- Reign: 1316–1325
- Coronation: 1316
- Predecessor: Stefan Dragutin
- Born: c. 1270
- Died: 1325 (aged 54–55)
- Spouse: Constanza Morosini
- Dynasty: Nemanjić
- Father: Stefan Dragutin
- Mother: Catherine of Hungary
- Religion: Serbian Orthodox

Stefan Vladislav II (Serbian Cyrillic: Стефан Владислав II; c. 1270–after 1326) was a King-pretender to the royal throne of the Kingdom of Serbia in 1316 and again in 1321, and Lord of Syrmia from 1316 to c. 1325. He was the eldest son of Serbian King Stefan Dragutin (ruled 1276–1282) and Catherine of Hungary. In 1282, Dragutin became ill and abdicated in favor of his younger brother Stefan Milutin, under the condition that Milutin would be succeeded by Dragutin's son Vladislav. Dragutin continued to rule the royal domain of Syrmia, which was later inherited by Vladislav (1316), who tried to secure Serbian royal crown, but failed, and later tried again after Milutin died in 1321, but also failed. He continued to rule in Syrmia until c. 1325.

== Early life ==
Born around 1270, Vladislav was the eldest son of the Crown Prince of Serbia, Stefan Dragutin, and Catherine of Hungary. Shortly before Vladislav's birth, Dragutin was awarded with the title of "junior king" in token of his right to succeed his father, Stefan Uroš I. Vladislav became the new heir to the Serbian throne after Dragutin dethroned his father with Hungarian assistance in 1276. A riding accident forced Dragutin to abdicate in favor of his younger brother, Stefan Milutin, in the spring of 1282, but he could retain the northern regions of Serbia as a separate realm. The Byzantine historian, George Pachymeres, recorded that the right of one of Dragutin's two sons (Vladislav or Urošica) to succeed Milutin was also confirmed.

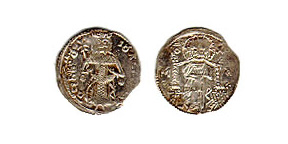
The image of Vladislav on a coin.

Vladislav's maternal cousin, Charles Martel of Anjou, who had laid claim to Hungary, awarded Vladislav with Slavonia and granted him the title of duke, implying that Vladislav and his father supported Charles Martel against Andrew III of Hungary in the early 1290s. Charles Martel's father, Charles II of Naples, confirmed the grant on 19 August 1292. Dragutin and Vladislav sought reconciliation with Andrew III. In 1293, Vladislav married Constanza Morosini who was a granddaughter of the king's maternal uncle, Albertino Morosini.

Milutin made steps to appoint his eldest son, Stefan Konstantin, as his heir from around 1306. He even approached Pope Clement V and offered the union of the Serbian Orthodox Church with Rome in return for the confirmation of Stefan Konstantin's right to succeed him.

Dragutin and Vladislav's support to Charles Martel ended in 1293 after Vladislav married Costanza Morosini, the niece of Andrew III. Andrew III died in 1301 and was succeeded by Charles Martel's son, Charles Robert.

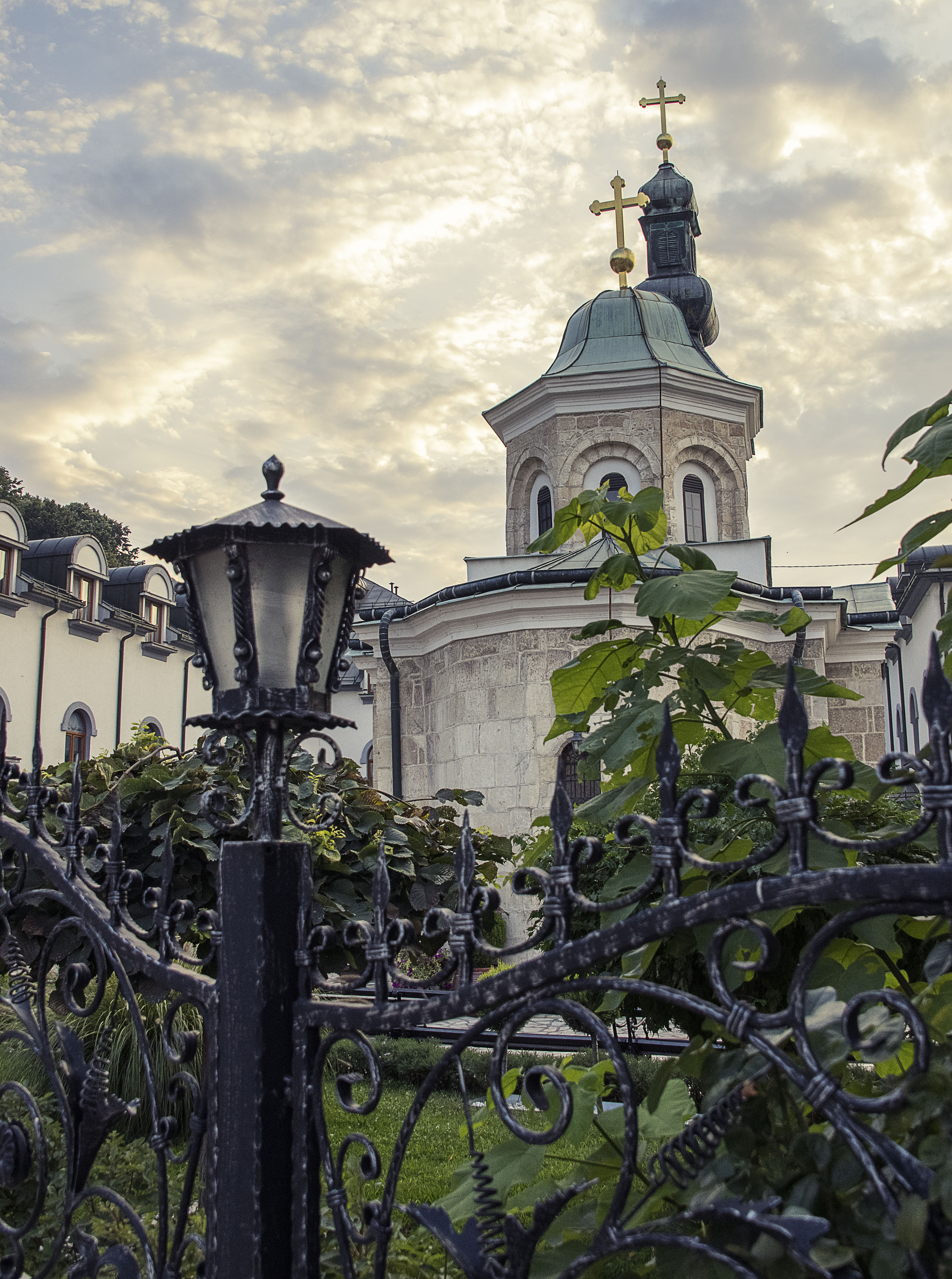
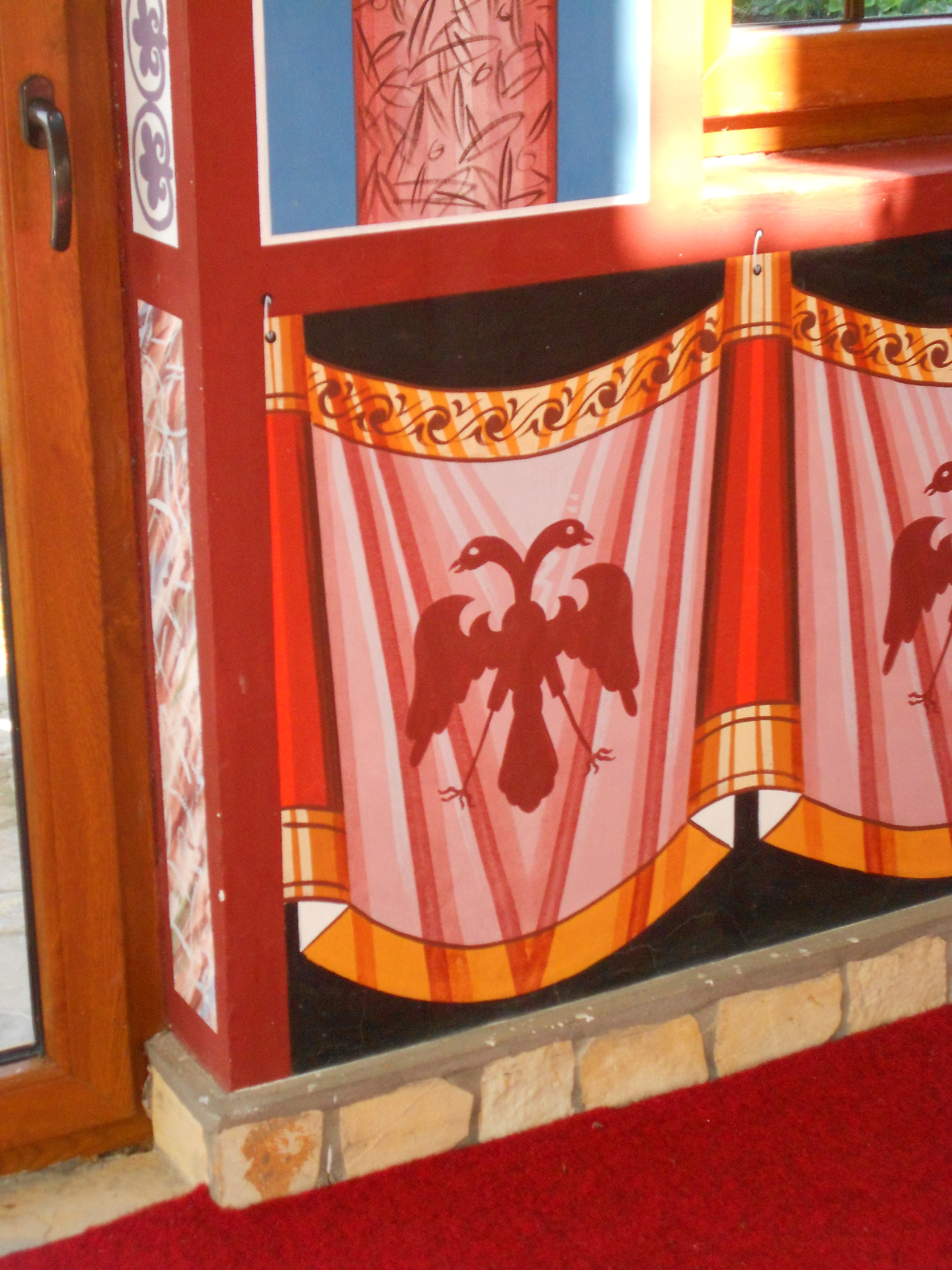
Church (left) and coat of arms of the Nemanjić dynasty (right) in the Tavna Monastery

After King Dragutin died in 1316, Vladislav succeeded him as ruler of the Kingdom of Syrmia, but the king of Serbia, Stefan Milutin, his uncle, defeated him and imprisoned him.

When Milutin died in 1321, the newly freed Vladislav got to rule the lands of his father, with the help of the Hungarians, the Bulgarians, the Bosnian Ban and the Šubić family. The rule, according to law, was to be given to Vladislav.

Tsar Michael Asen III of Bulgaria, newly in conflict with Vladislav's cousin Stefan Dečanski, the successor of Milutin, started to support Vladislav as the rightful monarch of whole Serbia, but this support showed insufficient. After having been beaten again by supporters of Stefan Dečanski, he retreated to the Kingdom of Hungary in 1324. Vladislav's sororal nephew Stephen II, Ban of Bosnia, then started to rule Vladislav's lands in Bosnia (Soli and Usora), and around Lower Syrmia where long battles between Serbs and Hungarians were frequent.

Vladislav was married to Constanza Morosini, maternal relative of Andrew III of Hungary.

== Sources ==
- Ćirković, Sima (2004). The Serbs. Malden: Blackwell Publishing. ISBN 9781405142915.
- Engel, Pál (2001). The Realm of St. Stephen: A History of Medieval Hungary, 895-1526. London & New York: I.B.Tauris. ISBN 9781850439776.
- Fine, John Van Antwerp Jr. (1994) [1987]. The Late Medieval Balkans: A Critical Survey from the Late Twelfth Century to the Ottoman Conquest. Ann Arbor, Michigan: University of Michigan Press. ISBN 0472082604.
- Ivanović, Miloš; Isailović, Neven (2015). "The Danube in Serbian-Hungarian Relations in the 14th and 15th Centuries" (PDF). Tibiscvm: Istorie–Arheologie. 5: 377–393. Archived from the original on 2024-08-01.
- Ivanović, Miloš (2019). "Serbian hagiographies on the warfare and political struggles of the Nemanjić dynasty (from the twelfth to the fourteenth century)" (PDF). Reform and Renewal in Medieval East and Central Europe: Politics, Law and Society. Cluj-Napoca: Romanian Academy, Center for Transylvanian Studies. pp. 103–129.
- Isailović, Neven (2016). "Living by the Border: South Slavic Marcher Lords in the Late Medieval Balkans (13th–15th Centuries)" (PDF). Banatica. 26 (2): 105–117. Archived from the original on 2025-05-08.
- Krstić, Aleksandar R. (2016). "The Rival and the Vassal of Charles Robert of Anjou: King Vladislav II Nemanjić" (PDF). Banatica. 26 (2): 33–51. Archived from the original on 2022-11-30.
- Thallóczy, Lajos; Áldásy, Antal, eds. (1907). Magyarország és Szerbia közti összeköttetések oklevéltára 1198-1526. Budapest: Magyar Tudományos Akadémia.
- Uzelac, Aleksandar B. (2011). "Tatars and Serbs at the end of the Thirteenth Century". Revista de istorie Militara. 5–6: 9–20.
- Vásáry, István (2005). Cumans and Tatars: Oriental Military in the Pre-Ottoman Balkans, 1185–1365. Cambridge: Cambridge University Press. ISBN 9781139444088.
- Živković, Vojislav (2021). Serbian Kings Dragutin and Milutin. The Problem of the Succession of the Serbian Throne at the End of the 13th and Beginning of the 14th Century. Niš & Vranje: Centar za crkvene studije; Svepravoslavno društvo Prepodobni Justin Ćelijski i Vranjski. ISBN 978-86-84105-59-4.

Regnal titles
Preceded by Stefan Dragutin	King-pretender of Serbia and Lord of Syrmia; 1316–1325	Succeeded by annexation Stefan Dečanski as King of all Serbia
