= Elizabeth the Cuman =

Queen consort of Hungary (1244–1290)

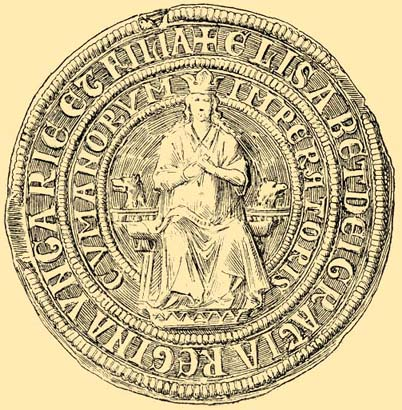

Queen consort of Hungary
- Tenure: 1270–1272
- Born: 1244
- Died: 1290 (aged 45–46)
- Spouse: Stephen V of Hungary (m. 1253; died 1272)
- Issue: Elizabeth, Queen of Serbia; Catherine, Queen of Serbia; Mary, Queen of Naples; Anna, Byzantine Empress; Ladislaus IV of Hungary; Andrew, Duke of Slavonia
- Dynasty: Terteroba
- Father: Köten (or possibly Seyhan, a Cuman chieftain)

Elizabeth the Cuman (1244–1290) was the queen consort of Stephen V of Hungary. She was regent of Hungary during the minority of her son from 1272 to 1277.

The Cumans were the western tribes of the Cuman-Kipchak confederation. Her people followed a shamanist religion and were considered pagans by contemporary Christians of Europe.

== Questions of parentage and family ==
In 1238, Khan Köten, her father according to historians, led the Cumans and a number of other clans in invading the Kingdom of Hungary while fleeing from the advancing hordes of the Mongol Empire. In time, Béla IV of Hungary negotiated an alliance with Köten and his people, granting them asylum in exchange for their conversion to Roman Catholicism and loyalty to the King. The agreement was sealed with the betrothal of Elizabeth to Stephen, eldest son of Béla IV. The agreement seems to have occurred while Stephen was an infant. Elizabeth was unlikely to have been older than her future husband. In 1241, the Mongol invasion of Europe under the leadership of Batu Khan and Subutai began, with Hungary among its primary targets. Köten was assassinated by Hungarian nobles fearing he would lead a defection to the other side.

Other historians point out that a charter of her father-in-law, Béla IV, refers to a Cuman chieftain Seyhan as his "kinsman," which can be interpreted to mean that Seyhan was in fact Elizabeth's father. It is unclear whether Seyhan refers to Köten or another chief, as it can be interpreted as a name or a title; Say-χan translates to "good khan".

She also had an unidentified sister, who married Hungarian noble Gregory Monoszló.

== Queen ==
Béla IV returned from Austria following the Mongol evacuation. Upon his return to power, Béla began rebuilding his country, including a massive construction campaign which produced the system of castles as a defense against the threat of a Mongol return. Köten was deceased but the betrothal was still in effect. Elizabeth was converted to Roman Catholicism in preparation for her marriage. The marriage of Stephen and Elizabeth occurred in 1253. The groom was twelve years old and the bride close in age to him. She became queen of Hungary upon her father-in-law's death on 3 May 1270.

== Regent ==
Stephen died on 6 August 1272. Elizabeth became regent for their ten-year-old son, Ladislaus IV. Her regency lasted until 1277 and saw palace revolutions and civil wars. Her upbringing of her son would cause further problems for his reign. Ladislaus favored the society of the "semi-pagan" Cumans, from whom he was descended through his mother. He wore Cuman dress as his court wear, surrounded himself with Cuman concubines and thus alienated the Hungarian nobility. His later attempts to regain Hungarian loyalty instead alienated parts of the Cumans. He was murdered in his tent by Cumans while camped in Bihar County on 10 July 1290. By that time Elizabeth herself seems to have also been deceased. There is no mention of her in the reign of his successor, Andrew III. There is a tradition that she died in the year 1290.

== Children ==
Elizabeth and Stephen V of Hungary were parents to six known children:

- Elizabeth (c. 1255 – 1322), married, firstly, to Záviš of Falkenstein, and, secondly, to King Stefan Uroš II Milutin of Serbia
- Catherine (c. 1257 – after 1314), married to King Stefan Dragutin of Serbia
- Maria (c. 1258 – 25 March 1323), married to King Charles II of Naples
- Anna (c. 1260 – 1281), married to the Byzantine emperor Andronikos II Palaiologos
- Ladislaus IV (August, 1262 – 10 July 1290), married to Elizabeth of Sicily
- Andrew (1268–1278), Duke of Slavonia

== Sources ==
- Encyclopædia Britannica Eleventh Edition

Royal titles
Preceded by Maria Laskarina	Queen consort of Hungary; 1270–1272	Succeeded by Elizabeth of Sicily
Preceded by Ugrin Csák; Ban of Macsó	Duchess of Macsó and Bosnia; 1279–1284	Succeeded by Stephen Dragutin; King of Syrmia
