= Stefan Dragutin =

King of Serbia from 1276 to 1282

Saint Stefan Dragutin Стефан Драгутин
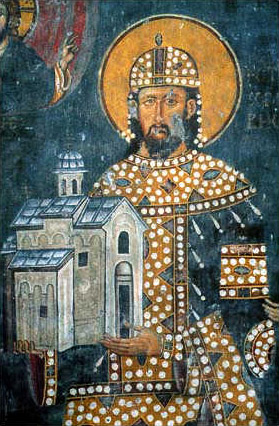
- King Dragutin, founder's portrait (fresco) in Saint Achillius Church, painted during his lifetime (around 1296)

Stefan the Teoktist
- Died: 12 March 1316
- Venerated in: Eastern Orthodox Church

King of Syrmia
- Tenure: 1282–1316
- Successor: Stefan Vladislav II

King of Serbia
- Tenure: 1276–1282
- Predecessor: Stefan Uroš I
- Successor: Stefan Uroš II Milutin
- Burial: Đurđevi Stupovi
- Spouse: Catherine of Hungary
- Issue: Vladislav; Elizabeth; Urošica
- Dynasty: Nemanjić
- Father: Stefan Uroš I
- Mother: Helen of Anjou
- Religion: Serbian Orthodox Christian

Stefan Dragutin (Serbian Cyrillic: Стефан Драгутин, Hungarian: Dragutin István; died 12 March 1316), was King of Serbia from 1276 to 1282. From 1282, he ruled a separate kingdom which included northern Serbia, and (from 1284) the neighboring Hungarian banates (or border provinces), for which he was unofficially styled "King of Syrmia".

He was the eldest son of King Stefan Uroš I of Serbia and Queen Helen. Dragutin married Catherine of Hungary, likely after his father concluded a peace treaty with her grandfather, Béla IV of Hungary, in 1268. By 1271, he received the title of "young king" in recognition of his right to succeed his father. He rebelled against his father, and with Hungarian assistance, forced him to abdicate in 1276.

Dragutin abandoned Uroš I's centralizing policy and ceded large territories to his mother in appanage. After a riding accident, he abdicated in favor of his brother Milutin in 1282, but retained the northern regions of Serbia along the Hungarian border. Two years later, his brother-in-law, Ladislaus IV of Hungary, granted him three banates—Mačva (or Sirmia ulterior), Usora and Soli. He was the first Serbian monarch to rule Belgrade. With his brother's support, he also occupied the Banate of Braničevo in 1284 or 1285.

In theory, Dragutin was a vassal both to his brother (for his Serbian territories), and to the Hungarian monarchs (for the four banates), but in practice he ruled his realm as an independent ruler from the 1290s. His conflicts with Milutin developed into open war in 1301, and he frequently raided the neighboring Hungarian lords from 1307. Most of the Serbian noblemen supported Dragutin, but he was forced to make peace with Milutin after Milutin's mercenaries routed him in 1311 or 1312. Before his death, he entered a monastery and died as the monk taking the name of Theoctistus, the fifth century Byzantine saint. On the list of Serbian saints, Dragutin is venerated on 12 November or 30 October (Old Style and New Style dates).

== Early life ==
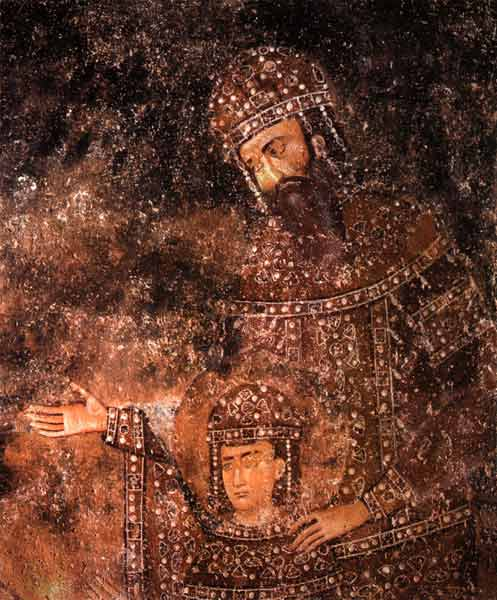
Dragutin and his father, Stefan Uroš I (a fresco in Sopoćani)

Dragutin was the eldest son of King Stefan Uroš I of Serbia, and Helen of Anjou. The place and date of his birth are unknown. In 1264, the monk Domentijan recorded that the "fourth generation" of the descendants of Stefan Nemanja was already old enough "to ride a horse and carry a warrior's lance". As Domentijan is obviously referring to Dragutin, the historian Miodrag Purković concluded Dragutin must have been twenty and dated his birth to around 1244.

The date of Dragutin's marriage with Catherine of Hungary is also unknown. His father and her grandfather, Béla IV of Hungary, most probably arranged the marriage during the peace negotiations that followed Uroš I's invasion of Mačva in 1268, but an earlier date cannot be excluded. Mačva was a Hungarian border province to the north of Serbia which had been governed by Béla IV's daughter, Anna, on behalf of her minor son, Béla. Uroš I launched a plundering raid against the province, but he was captured and forced to seek a reconciliation. Catherine's father, Stephen V, had been bearing the title of "younger king" as his father's co-ruler and heir and the same title was bestowed on Dragutin in recognition of his exclusive right to inherit Serbia from his father. The Peace of Pressburg between Stephen V and King Ottokar II of Bohemia is the oldest extant document which describes Dragutin as a "younger king".

Decades later, Danilo II, Archbishop of Serbia, recorded that Dragutin's Hungarian in-laws also expected that Uroš would cede parts of his realm to Dragutin to allow him to rule them independently. The peace agreement may have explicitly prescribed the division of Serbia between Uroš I and Dragutin, according to Aleksandar Krstić and other historians. After spending years strengthening his central government, Uroš was reluctant to divide his kingdom with his son. Dragutin and his wife were living in his father's court when a Byzantine envoy visited Serbia in the late 1260s.

Dragutin rose up against his father in 1276. Whether he wanted to persuade his father to share power with him, or he was afraid of being disinherited in favor of his younger brother, Milutin, cannot be determined. Dragutin's brother-in-law, Ladislaus IV of Hungary, sent Hungarian and Cuman troops to Serbia to assist him. Dragutin routed his father near Gacko in the autumn of 1276. Uroš abdicated without further resistance and entered the Sopoćani Monastery where he died a year later.

== Reign ==
=== Serbia ===
The archbishop of Serbia, Joanikije I, abdicated after the fall of Uroš I. His abdication may have been to protest Dragutin's usurpation of the throne, or he may have been forced to resign because of his close relationship with the dethroned monarch. Soon after ascending the throne, Dragutin gave large parts of Serbia—including Zeta, Trebinje and other coastal territories, and Plav—to his mother in appanage. The lands of Helen's appanage included the core territories of the former Kingdom of Duklja and developed into a province of the heirs to the Serbian throne after her death. Milutin accompanied their mother to her realm and settled in Shkodër.

Serbia's relationship with the Republic of Ragusa had been tense during the last years of Uroš I's reign, although his wife secretly supported the republic. Dragutin reconciled shortly after he had ascended the throne. Charles I of Anjou, King of Sicily, wanted to include Dragutin in a coalition against the Byzantine Empire. The two kings exchanged letters about this issue in 1279.

Dragutin fell off his horse and broke his leg in early 1282. His injury was so severe a council was called in Deževo to make decisions about governing Serbia. At the council, Dragutin abdicated in favor of Milutin, but the circumstances of his abdication are uncertain. Decades later, Dragutin recounted that he had already come into conflict with Milutin, and that he had ceded the government to Milutin only provisionally, until he recovered. Archbishop Danilo II wrote that Dragutin abdicated because he regarded the riding accident as God's punishment for his acts against his father, but the Archbishop also referred to unspecified "serious troubles" that contributed to Dragutin's decision. The Byzantine historian, George Pachymeres, was informed that Dragutin's abdication had been definitive, but Pachymeres also mentioned an agreement between the two brothers that secured the right of Dragutin's (unnamed) son to succeed Milutin.

=== Sirmia ulterior ===
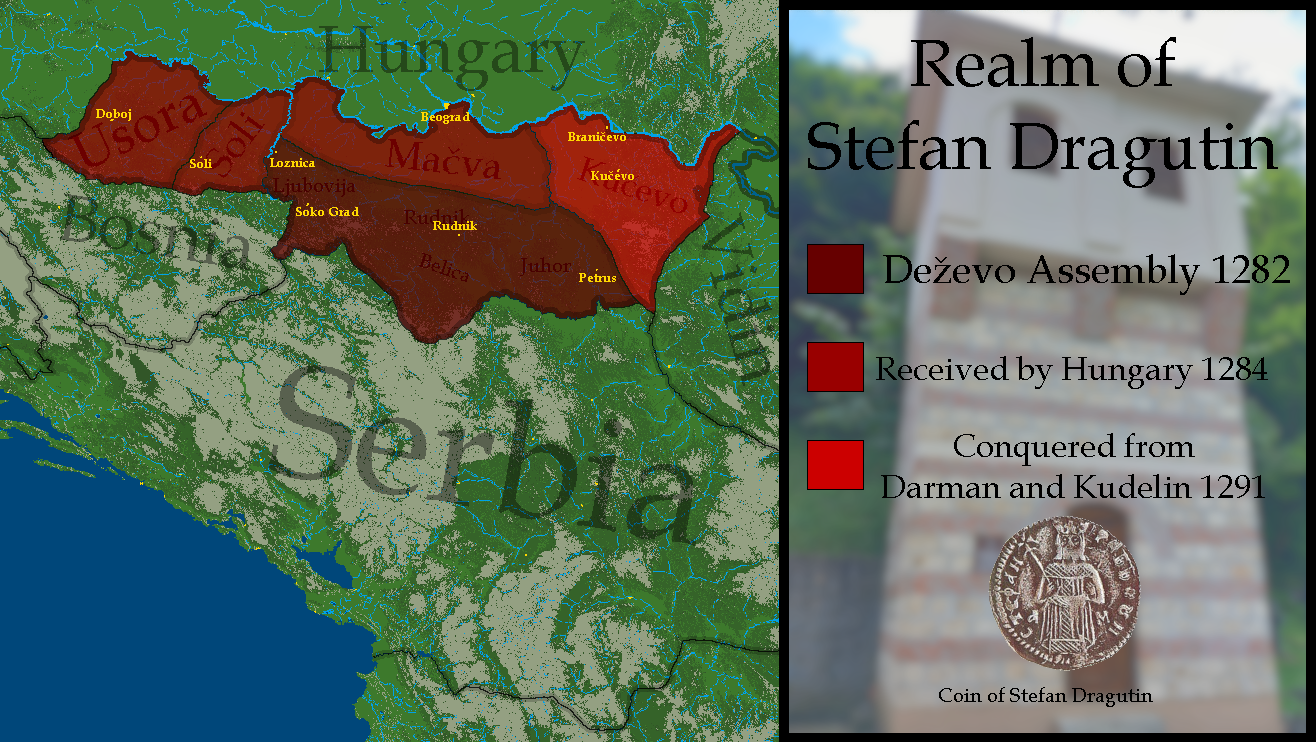
Realm of Stefan Dragutin with its northern borders on the Sava and Danube rivers

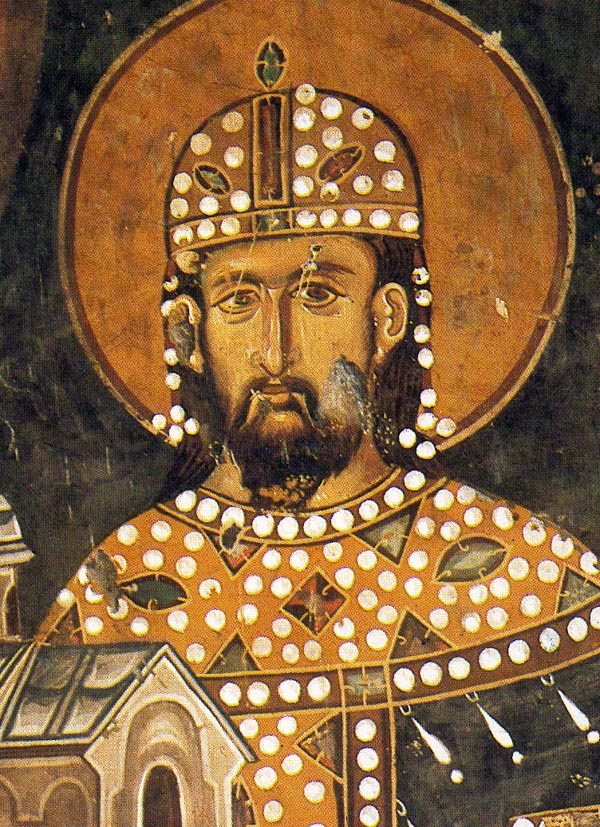
King Dragutin, founder's portrait (fresco) in Saint Achillius Church, painted during his lifetime (around 1296)

Inscriptions on frescos and diplomatic correspondence provide evidence that Dragutin was styled "king" after his abdication, but Milutin's supreme position is evident. Dragutin continued to style himself as king in his charters and on his coins. Dragutin and Milutin wore royal insignias seen on a fresco in St. Achillius Church, which was Dragutin's endowment near Arilje, but Dragutin is depicted with fewer royal emblems. Actually, Serbia was divided between Dragutin and Milutin at Dragutin's abdication, with Dragutin retaining the northern region along the Hungarian border, including the recently opened silver mine at Rudnik. He also held territories in western Serbia on the river Lim, thus he was his brother's most powerful vassal. Ladislaus IV of Hungary granted Mačva, Usora and Soli to Dragutin in the second half of 1284. Relatives of the Hungarian monarchs, most recently Dragutin's mother-in-law, Elizabeth the Cuman, had held the same territories in appanage, and Dragutin continued to rule them as a Hungarian vassal. Mačva was also known as Sirmia ulterior, hence Dragutin's contemporaries often styled him as "King of Srem". He took up his seat at Debrc on the Sava, but he also regularly stayed in Belgrade. He was the first Serbian monarch to rule this town.

Dragutin administered his realm independently of his brother. He supported the Franciscans' missions in Bosnia and allowed the establishment of a Catholic see in Belgrade. Two Cuman or Bulgarian warlords, Darman and Kudelin, had seized a former Hungarian banate, the Banate of Braničevo. Dragutin invaded Braničevo with Hungarian assistance in 1284 or 1285 but could not defeat them. Darman and Kudelin hired Cuman and Tatar troops and began raiding Dragutin's realm. Dragutin sought help from Milutin and the two brothers met in Mačkovac. After they joined their forces and defeated Darman and Kudelin, Dragutin seized Braničevo in 1291 or 1292. The new Hungarian monarch, Andrew III, also supported their military action, but Andrew's weak position in Hungary enabled Dragutin to strengthen his independence.

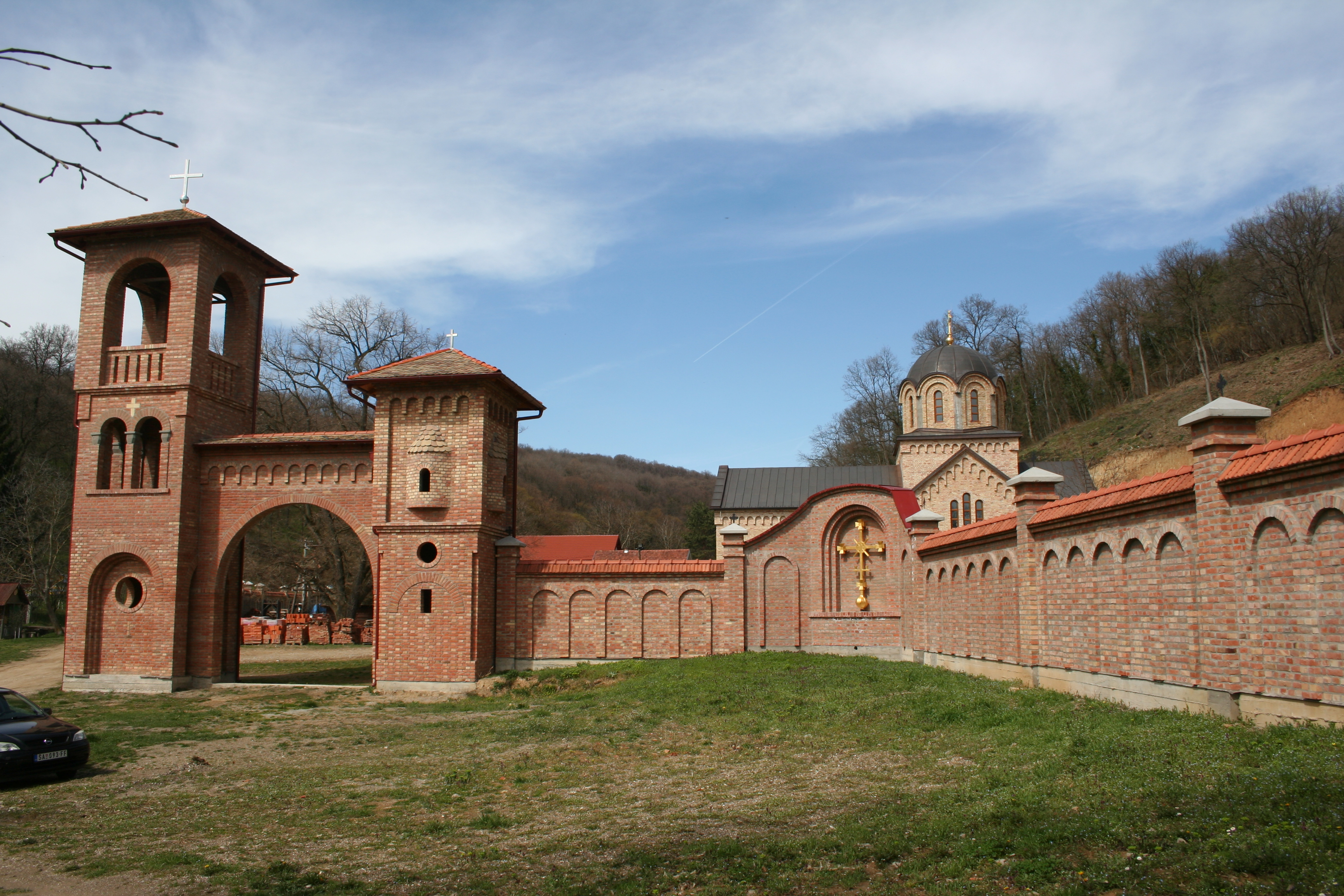
Bešenovo Monastery in Bešenovački Prnjavor, Syrmia

Dragutin's sister-in-law, Mary, had laid claim to Hungary after the death of her brother, Ladislaus IV. Dragutin was allegedly willing to support her and her son, Charles Martel of Anjou. Charles Martel, who regarded himself the lawful king of Hungary, granted Slavonia to Dragutin's son, Vladislav, in 1292, but most Hungarian noblemen and prelates remained loyal to Andrew III. Dragutin also sought a reconciliation with Andrew, and Vladislav married Constance, the granddaughter of Andrew's uncle, Albertino Morosini in 1293. Dragutin took advantage of the disintegration of Hungary during the last decade of the 13th century and became one of the dozen "oligarchs" (or powerful lords) who ruled vast territories independently of the monarch.

Dragutin supported his brother's attacks against the Byzantine territories in Macedonia in the 1290s. After Milutin had made peace with the Byzantine Empire in 1299, dozens of Serbian noblemen, who had benefited from the war, moved to Dragutin's realm. Tensions between the two brothers grew rapidly, most probably because Milutin wanted to secure the succession in Serbia for his own sons. In 1301, open war broke out and Milutin occupied Rudnik after taking it from Dragutin. According to Ragusan reports, a peace treaty was made in late 1302, but Dragutin's troops or allies pillaged Milutin's silver mines at Brskovo in 1303. The armed conflict lasted for more than a decade, but its details are unknown. The parties allegedly avoided fighting pitched battles and Dragutin kept his realm almost intact, although income from the silver mines enabled Milutin to hire mercenaries.

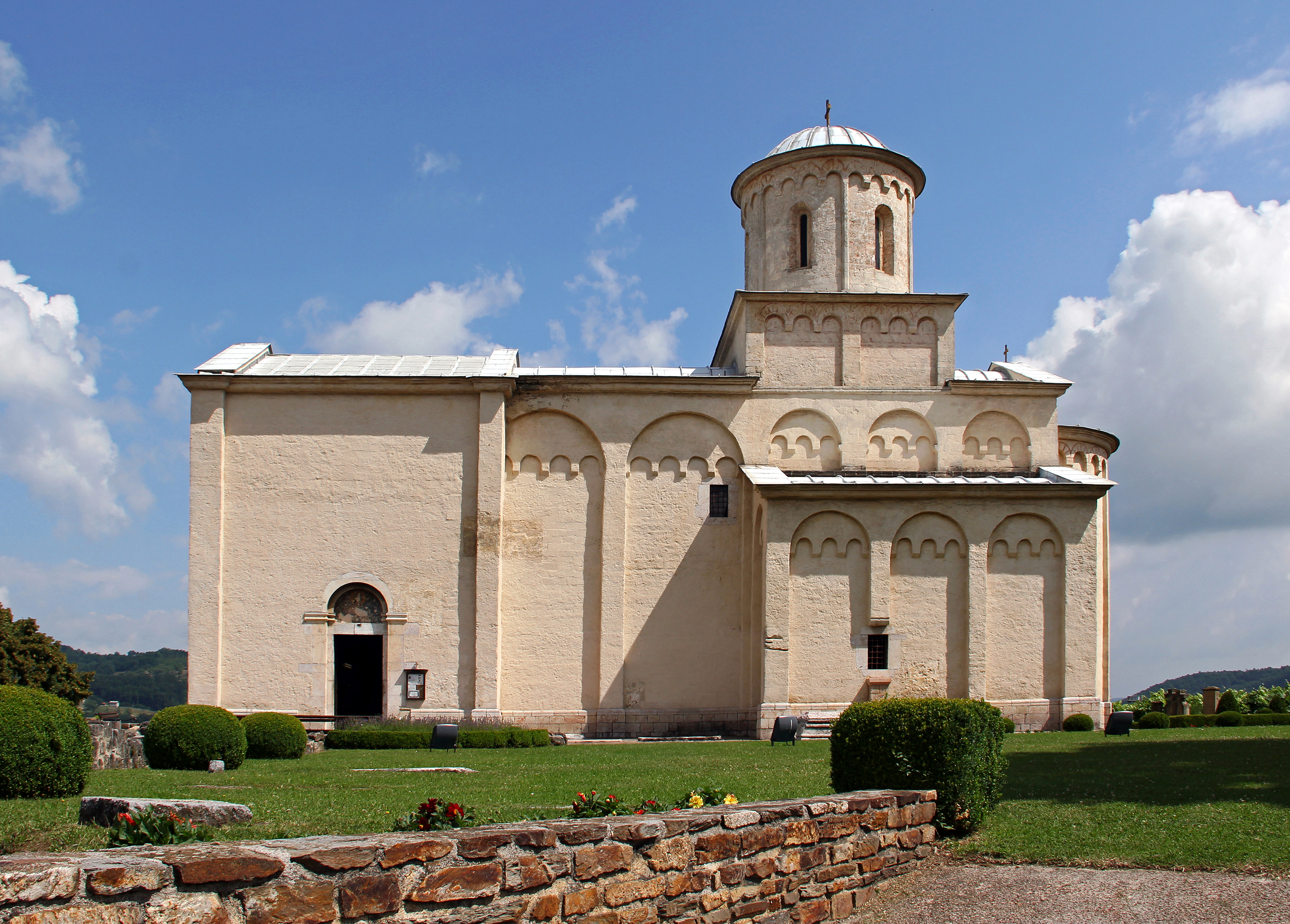
Church of St. Achillius in Arilje

Charles Martel's son, Charles Robert, came to Hungary to assert his claim to the throne in 1300. His grandfather, Charles II of Naples, listed Dragutin and Dragutin's wife among Charles Robert's principal supporters. Between the summer of 1301 and May 1304, Charles Robert spent much of his time in the powerful Ugrin Csák's domains, which were located to the north of Dragutin's realm, implying that Charles Robert's relationship with Dragutin was cordial. For unknown reasons, Dragutin's troops pillaged Csák's domains in 1307, but Csák launched a counter-attack and defeated Dragutin's army on an unknown date, sometime before 13 October 1307. Dragutin made an alliance with Charles Robert's opponent, Ladislaus Kán, who ruled Transylvania in the 1300s. Dragutin's Orthodox son married Kán's daughter, for which the papal legate, Gentile Portino da Montefiore, excommunicated Kán at the end of 1309. Historian Alexandar Krstić proposes that Dragutin wanted to secure the Hungarian throne for his elder son, Vladislav, and the Serbian throne for his younger son, Urošica. Records of the destruction that Dragutin and his troops wreaked in Valkó and Szerém Counties most probably refer to Dragutin's frequent raids against Ugrin Csák's territories in 1309 and 1310. His ally John Smaragd led Dragutin's army, but was defeated by Paul Garai, Ugrin's commander. Dragutin also seized properties of the Archbishopric of Kalocsa, which prevented the newly elected Archbishop Demetrius from visiting Rome before the end of 1312. His conflict with Charles Robert forced him to fight on two fronts. He could continue the war against his brother after Serbian noblemen rose up against Milutin in the early 1310s. The Serbian prelates remained loyal to Milutin and helped him to hire Tatar, Jassic and Turkish mercenaries. After Milutin inflicted a decisive defeat on Dragutin in late 1311 or 1312, the prelates mediated a peace treaty between them most probably in 1312. Dragutin had to acknowledge his brother as the lawful king, but his Serbian appanage (including the silver mine at Rudnik) was fully restored to him. Dragutin sent reinforcements to help his brother's fight against the powerful Ban of Croatia, Mladen II Šubić of Bribir, in 1313. According to Krstić, Dragutin obviously made a peace treaty with Charles Robert in Sremska Mitrovica in February 1314. In 1314 or 1316, Dragutin signed his brother's charter of the grant to the Banjska Monastery as "the former king".

Dragutin became a monk and adopted the name Teoctist shortly before his death. According to Archbishop Danilo II's biography, while he was dying, he stated he could not be venerated as a saint. He died on 12 March 1316. He was buried in the Đurđevi Stupovi Monastery. He is regarded as the second founder of the monastery, which had been built by his great-grandfather, Stephen Nemanja. On the list of Serbian saints, Dragutin is venerated on 12 November or 30 October (Old Style and New Style dates). He was succeeded, in his northern domains, by his son, Stefan Vladislav II.

== Sources ==
- Bataković, Dušan T., ed. (2005). Histoire du peuple serbe [History of the Serbian People] (in French). Lausanne: L’Age d’Homme. ISBN 9782825119587.
- Ćirković, Sima (2004). The Serbs. Malden: Blackwell Publishing. ISBN 9781405142915.
- Curta, Florin (2019). Eastern Europe in the Middle Ages (500-1300). Leiden and Boston: Brill. ISBN 9789004395190.
- Dvornik, Francis (1962). The Slavs in European History and Civilization. New Brunswick: Rutgers University Press. ISBN 9780813507996.
- Engel, Pál (2001). The Realm of St. Stephen: A History of Medieval Hungary, 895-1526. London & New York: I.B.Tauris. ISBN 9781850439776.
- Fine, John Van Antwerp Jr. (1994) [1987]. The Late Medieval Balkans: A Critical Survey from the Late Twelfth Century to the Ottoman Conquest. Ann Arbor, Michigan: University of Michigan Press. ISBN 0472082604.
- Gál, Judit (2013). "IV. Béla és I. Uroš szerb uralkodó kapcsolata" [The Relationship of Kings Béla IV of Hungary and Uroš I of Serbia]. Századok (in Hungarian). 147 (2): 471–499.
- Ivanović, Miloš; Isailović, Neven (2015). "The Danube in Serbian-Hungarian Relations in the 14th and 15th Centuries". Tibiscvm: Istorie–Arheologie. 5: 377–393.
- Ivanović, Miloš (2019). "Serbian Hagiographies on the Warfare and Political Struggles of the Nemanjić Dynasty (from the Twelfth to Fourteenth Century)". Reform and Renewal in Medieval East and Central Europe: Politics, Law and Society. Cluj-Napoca: Romanian Academy, Center for Transylvanian Studies. pp. 103–129.
- Jireček, Constantin (1911). Geschichte der Serben. Vol. 1. Gotha: Perthes.
- Jireček, Constantin (1918). Geschichte der Serben. Vol. 2. Gotha: Perthes.
- Kalić, Jovanka (2014). "A Millennium of Belgrade (Sixth-Sixteenth Centuries): A Short Overview" (PDF). Balcanica (45): 71–96. doi:10.2298/BALC1445071K.
- Kartalija, Nebojša (2020). "The Perception of the Balkans in Western Travel Literature from the Eleventh to the Fourteenth Century". Voyages and Travel Accounts in Historiography and Literature. Vol. 1. Budapest: Trivent. pp. 141–165.
- Krstić, Aleksandar R. (2016). "The Rival and the Vassal of Charles Robert of Anjou: King Vladislav II Nemanjić". Banatica. 26 (2): 33–51.
- Marjanović-Dušanić, Smilja (2006). "Lʹ idéologie monarchique dans les chartes de la dynastie serbe des Némanides (1168-1371): Étude diplomatique". Archiv für Diplomatik: Schriftgeschichte, Siegel- und Wappenkunde. 52: 149–158. doi:10.7788/afd.2006.52.jg.149. S2CID 96483243.
- McDaniel, Gordon L. (1984). "On Hungarian-Serbian Relations in the Thirteenth Century: John Angelos and Queen Jelena" (PDF). Ungarn-Jahrbuch. 12 (1982-1983): München, 1984: 43–50.
- McDaniel, Gordon L. (1986). "The House of Anjou and Serbia". Louis the Great: King of Hungary and Poland. Boulder: East European Monographs. pp. 191–200. ISBN 9780880330879.
- Mileusnić, Slobodan (1998). Medieval Monasteries of Serbia (4th ed.). Novi Sad: Prometej. ISBN 9788676393701.
- Miller, William (1923). "The Balkan States, I: The Zenith of Bulgaria and Serbia (1186-1355)". The Cambridge Medieval History. Vol. 4. Cambridge: University Press. pp. 517–551.
- Purković, Miodrag A. (1951). "Two Notes on Mediaeval Serbian History". The Slavonic and East European Review. 29 (73): 545–549. JSTOR 4204256.
- Setton, Kenneth M. (1976). The Papacy and the Levant (1204–1571). Vol. 1. Philadelphia: The American Philosophical Society. ISBN 9780871691149.
- Stojkovski, Boris; Kartalija, Nebojša (2019). "Serbia through the Eyes of Contemporary Western Travelers in the Age of Nemanjić Dynasty (1166-1371)" (PDF). Deseti međunarodni interdisciplinarni simpozijum Susret kultura: Zbornik radova. Novi Sad: Filozofski fakultet. pp. 305–321.
- Thallóczy, Lajos; Áldásy, Antal, eds. (1907). Magyarország és Szerbia közti összeköttetések oklevéltára 1198-1526. Budapest: Magyar Tudományos Akadémia.
- Thomson, Francis J. (1993). "Archbishop Daniel II of Serbia: Hierarch, Hagiographer, Saint: With Some Comments on the Vitae regum et archiepiscoporum Serbiae and the Cults of Mediaeval Serbian Saints". Analecta Bollandiana. 111 (1–2): 103–134. doi:10.1484/J.ABOL.4.03279.
- Uzelac, Aleksandar B. (2011). "Tatars and Serbs at the end of the Thirteenth Century". Revista de istorie Militara. 5–6: 9–20.
- Vásáry, István (2005). Cumans and Tatars: Oriental Military in the Pre-Ottoman Balkans, 1185–1365. Cambridge: Cambridge University Press. ISBN 9781139444088.
- Živković, Vojislav (2021). Serbian Kings Dragutin and Milutin. The Problem of the Succession of the Serbian Throne at the End of the 13th and Beginning of the 14th Century. Niš & Vranje: Centar za crkvene studije; Svepravoslavno društvo Prepodobni Justin Ćelijski i Vranjski. ISBN 978-86-84105-59-4.

Stefan Dragutin Nemanjić dynasty Died: 12 March 1316
Regnal titles
Preceded by Uroš I	King of Serbia; 1276–1282	Succeeded by Milutin
Preceded by new title	King of Syrmia; 1282–1316	Succeeded by Vladislav
