= Banate of Só =

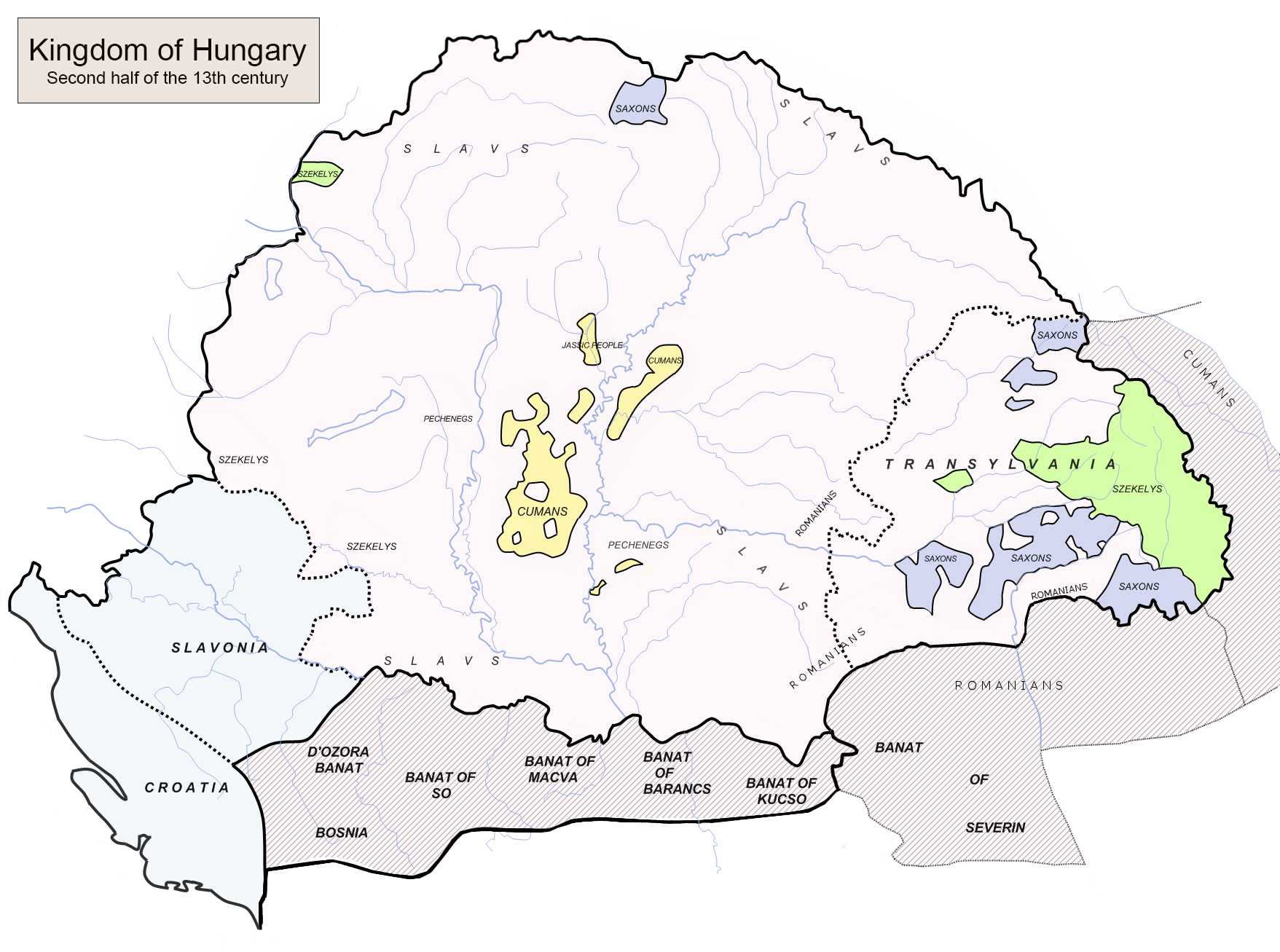
Banates of the Kingdom of Hungary on the southern borderlands

The Banate of Só (Hungarian: Sói bánság or Sófölde) was an administrative unit (banate) on the southern borders of the Kingdom of Hungary between the 12th and the early 15th centuries. Appointed by the king, it was governed by a ban, who served as both administrative and military leader.

The banate was created upon the territorial expansion of Hungary during the reign of Béla II (1131–1141). Named after the region of Só (Soli), its area stretched from the salt mines around Só (Tuzla), down along both banks of the Bosna till the line of the Sava and Drina rivers.

In 1410 King Sigismund of Hungary defeated Stephen Ostoja of Bosnia, who rebelled against his rule, and subsequently attached the banate to the rest of the Kingdom of Hungary, excluding the Castle of Srebrenik and the surrounding lands, that were transferred to Hungary's vassal state, the Serbian Despotate.

== List of rulers ==
- Ugrin Csák
- Matej Ninoslav, 1232–1250
- Ernye Ákos
- Stephen Dragutin
- Stephen II Kotromanić

== See also ==
- Soli (region)
