= Elizabeth of Sicily, Queen of Hungary =

Queen consort of Hungary (1261–1303)

Elizabeth of Sicily

Queen consort of Hungary
- Tenure: 1272–1290
- Born: 1261; Naples, Kingdom of Naples
- Died: 1303 (aged 41–42); Naples, Kingdom of Naples
- Burial: Monastery of St Peter's, Naples
- Spouse: Ladislaus IV of Hungary (m. 1270; died 1290)
- House: Anjou-Sicily
- Father: Charles I of Naples
- Mother: Beatrice of Provence

Elisabeth of Sicily (Hungarian: Szicíliai Erzsébet, Croatian: Elizabeta Sicilijanska, Slovak: Alžbeta Sicílska., Italian: Elisabetta di Sicilia; 1261–1303) was Queen of Hungary by marriage to Ladislaus IV of Hungary.

== Life ==
Elizabeth was the youngest child of Charles I of Naples and his first wife Beatrice of Provence. She married Ladislaus IV of Hungary in 1270. They had no children. Ladislaus had neglected Elisabeth for the sake of his semi-pagan tribe, the Cumans; his mother Elizabeth was a member of the Cuman tribe. Ladislaus always wore Cuman dress and many of his friends were Cumans.

=== Queen ===
Elisabeth spent most of her time as Queen alone while Ladislaus pursued the Cumans, encouraging them to live in Hungary. Elisabeth was confined to a convent in 1286 so that Ladislaus could live with a Cuman mistress. Ladislaus finally reconciled with Elisabeth in 1289. When he found he did not have enough power to rule over his barons, he rejoined the Cumans.

Ladislaus died in 1290, childless, and he was succeeded by Andrew III of Hungary.

=== Later life ===
After her husband's death, Elisabeth returned to Naples, but she came back to Hungary. In the year 1294 Queen Fenenna confirmed on her the privilege to collect the donations of the church in the Veszprém County. In 1301 she returned to Naples, where she became a Dominican nun at St Peter's monastery (San Pietro a Castello), which had been founded by her sister-in-law Queen Mary. Queen Elisabeth (Isabella d'Anjou) died in 1303 and was buried at the monastery of St Peter's.

== Sources ==
- Casteen, Elizabeth (2016). From She-Wolf to Martyr: The Reign and Disputed Reputation of Johanna I of Naples. Cornell University Press. ISBN 9781501701009.
- Lendvai, Paul (2021). The Hungarians: A Thousand Years of Victory in Defeat. Princeton University Press. ISBN 9780691200286.59

Elizabeth of Sicily, Queen of Hungary House of Anjou Cadet branch of the Capetian dynasty Born: 1261 Died: 1303
Royal titles
Preceded by Elizabeth the Cuman	Queen consort of Hungary; 1272–1290	Succeeded by Fennena of Kujavia
