= Giovanni Cornaro (diplomat) =

Venetian nobleman and diplomat

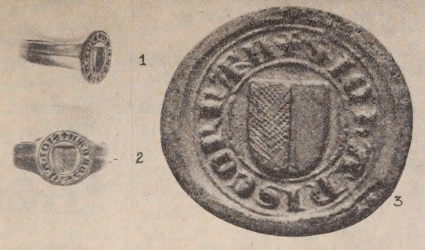
The signet ring of Giovanni Cornaro (drawing and its enlarged plaster copy)

Giovanni Cornaro (or Giovanni Corner; fl. 1238–1291) was a 13th-century Venetian nobleman and diplomat.

== Life ==
Giovanni Cornaro was born around 1210. He was a member of the "dalla Sbarra" branch of the illustrious Cornaro family as the son of Andrea Cornaro and Marietta Contarini. He had a brother Renier and a sister Agnese.

Giovanni Cornaro is first mentioned by contemporary records in 1238, when he served as senator of Venice. In that year, he was sent as envoy of the La Serenissima to the Roman Curia of Pope Gregory IX in the subject of trade disputes between Venice and the Republic of Genoa. Thereafter, Cornaro acted as envoy to Frederick II, Holy Roman Emperor, who held his imperial court in Padua then.

He was one of those patricians, who elected Marino Morosini as doge of Venice in 1249. By then, the relationship between the two families, the Cornaros and Morosinis was strong, since Giovanni's sister Agnese married Michele Morosini, the son of Marino. Their marriage produced three children, including Albertino Morosini, a Venetian governor of several provinces in the 13th century, and Tomasina Morosini, who married exiled Hungarian prince Stephen the Posthumous.

As a representative of Venice, Cornaro attended the Second Council of Lyon in 1274, alongside Paolo da Molino and Pancrazio Malipiero. Andrew III, the son of Giovanni's niece Tomasina, was elected king of Hungary in July 1290. After Andrew consolidated his power by the late summer of 1291, the Republic of Venice decided to send an official delegation to Hungary in September 1291. Giovanni Cornaro, then a Procurator of Saint Mark, was appointed to lead the diplomatic mission and was granted permission to stay for six months in the kingdom by the Great Council of Venice. He was mandated to express the great joy felt over Andrew's accession to the throne, and to achieve the renewal of the treaties over the trade in Dalmatia between the two states. Queen mother Tomasina, who was invited to Hungary by her son, also joined the delegation, which carried gifts and a full crew (servants, chefs, stewards and notaries), along with twenty four horses. The Venetian ships were heading for Zadar, where the delegation of Trogir would have joined them with supplies and the local citizens paid homage to Queen Tomasina on 18 September. However, the ships of the delegation spent a long time wandering off the coast of Dalmatia in the following months, because of the piracy activity of the Šubići, partisans of the rival Angevins. In May 1292, the Great Council instructed the delegation, that if they cannot continue their journey within weeks (it is plausible that they were unable to leave Zadar securely), they should return to the lagoons of Venice. The delegation was finally able to continue their journey and Tomasina arrived to Hungary in July 1292.

The fate of the elderly Giovanni is unknown, but it is possible he survived the ordeals at sea and arrived Hungary too. His only known son was Marco, the grandfather of Marco Cornaro, the 59th doge of Venice.

== Signet ring ==
A golden signet ring with circumscription "S (igillum) IOHAN(N)ISCORNARII", also depicting a party per pale, was preserved in the Hungarian National Museum, which acquired it from the collection of Miklós Jankovich in 1832. Formerly, it was attributed to the first (r. 1625–1629) or second doge (r. 1709–1722) with the name Giovanni Cornaro, along with a 16th-century German physician Janus Cornarius (Johann Hagenbutt).

The escutcheon definitely depicts the coat-of-arms of the Cornaro family. The font of the inscription and the method of engraving the seal refer to late 13th-century and early 14th-century Italian analogies, thus it was clearly belonged to Giovanni Cornaro, who entered Hungary in 1291.

== Sources ==
- Bácsatyai, Dániel (2023). "A széplelkű kamaraispán és más szerencselovagok. III. András olaszai [The Belletrist Chamber Ispán and other Adventurers. The Italians of Andrew III]". Századok (in Hungarian). 157 (6). Magyar Történelmi Társulat: 1171–1193. ISSN 0039-8098.
- Pásztoryné Alcsuti, Katalin (1941). "Giovanni Cornaro pecsétgyűrűje [Signet Ring of Giovanni Cornaro]". Folia archeologica. 3–4. Hungarian National Museum: 272–280. ISSN 0133-2023.
- Štefánik, Martin (2008). "The Morosinis in Hungary under King Andrew III and the two versions of the death of the Queen of Hungary Tommasina" (PDF). Historický Časopis. 56 (Supplement): 3–15. ISSN 0018-2575.
