= Tralusius =

Italian-born Hungarian noble

Castellan of Visegrád
- Reign: 1294/1299
- Predecessor: Eyza (?)
- Successor: Frederick Szentemágócs
- Noble family: Árpád dynasty (illegitimate)
- Father: Stephen the Posthumous
- Mother: a concubine

Tralusius or Tiralusius (Italian: Tralusio) was an Italian-born Hungarian noble in the late 13th century. He was an illegitimate son of Stephen the Posthumous and thus a half-brother of King Andrew III of Hungary.

== Life ==
His father Stephen was a pretender to the Hungarian throne, who lived in exile and was regarded as bastard by the ruling Árpád dynasty in Hungary. Based on his name, it is possible that Tralusius was born in the mid-1250s or early 1260s, when Stephen returned to Italy from the Kingdom of Aragon. His older half-brother Aimericus was born in the latter place. Stephen the Posthumous stayed in the Republic of Venice. He married twice, the future Andrew III was born around 1265 from his second marriage. The ailing Stephen compiled his last will and testament on 10 April 1271. In the document, Stephen also mentioned his two natural sons without specifying their name and age, who he financially and hypothetically took care of from the incomes of Slavonia and Este, after his heir Andrew takes possession of these two estates.

When Andrew III succeeded the Hungarian throne in 1290, both Aimericus and Tralusius arrived to Hungary in the following months or years, in order to receive a share of the property of the acquired Slavonia in accordance with his father's above-mentioned last testament. Tralusius was made castellan of the royal castle of Visegrád sometime after 1294. In an undated royal charter, Andrew III postponed a payment obligation because he was in Visegrád with his brother ("frater") Tralusius, who bore the title of comes. He held the position sometime until 1299, when Frederick Szentemágócs is mentioned in this capacity. It is possible that Tralusius, simultaneously with the position of castellan, also served as ispán of Pilis County (the two offices were often combined at that time). In this capacity, he once arbitrarily and unlawfully relocated the population of Kékes to Szentendre, causing a damage to the Diocese of Veszprém, according to a complaint from 1301. In that year, Andrew III died which resulted the extinction of the Árpád dynasty and Tralusius was referred to as a "former" castlellan. In April 1301, upon the order of Pope Boniface VIII, the royal chancellor and Archbishop of Kalocsa John Hont-Pázmány entrusted the abbot of Pilis and Paul, cantor of Buda to persuade the people to move back from Szentendre to Kékes, otherwise they will be excommunicated.

The fate of Tralusius is unknown, if he outlived the death of Andrew III at all.

== Sources ==
- Bácsatyai, Dániel (2023). "A széplelkű kamaraispán és más szerencselovagok. III. András olaszai [The Belletrist Chamber Ispán and other Adventurers. The Italians of Andrew III]". Századok (in Hungarian). 157 (6). Magyar Történelmi Társulat: 1171–1193. ISSN 0039-8098.
- Zsoldos, Attila (2011). Magyarország világi archontológiája, 1000–1301 [Secular Archontology of Hungary, 1000–1301] (in Hungarian). História, MTA Történettudományi Intézete. ISBN 978-963-9627-38-3.

Political offices
Preceded by Eyza (?)	Ispán of Pilis (?); Castellan of Visegrád; 1294/1299	Succeeded by Frederick Szentemágócs
