= Tomasina Morosini =

Venetian noblewoman

- Duchess of Slavonia
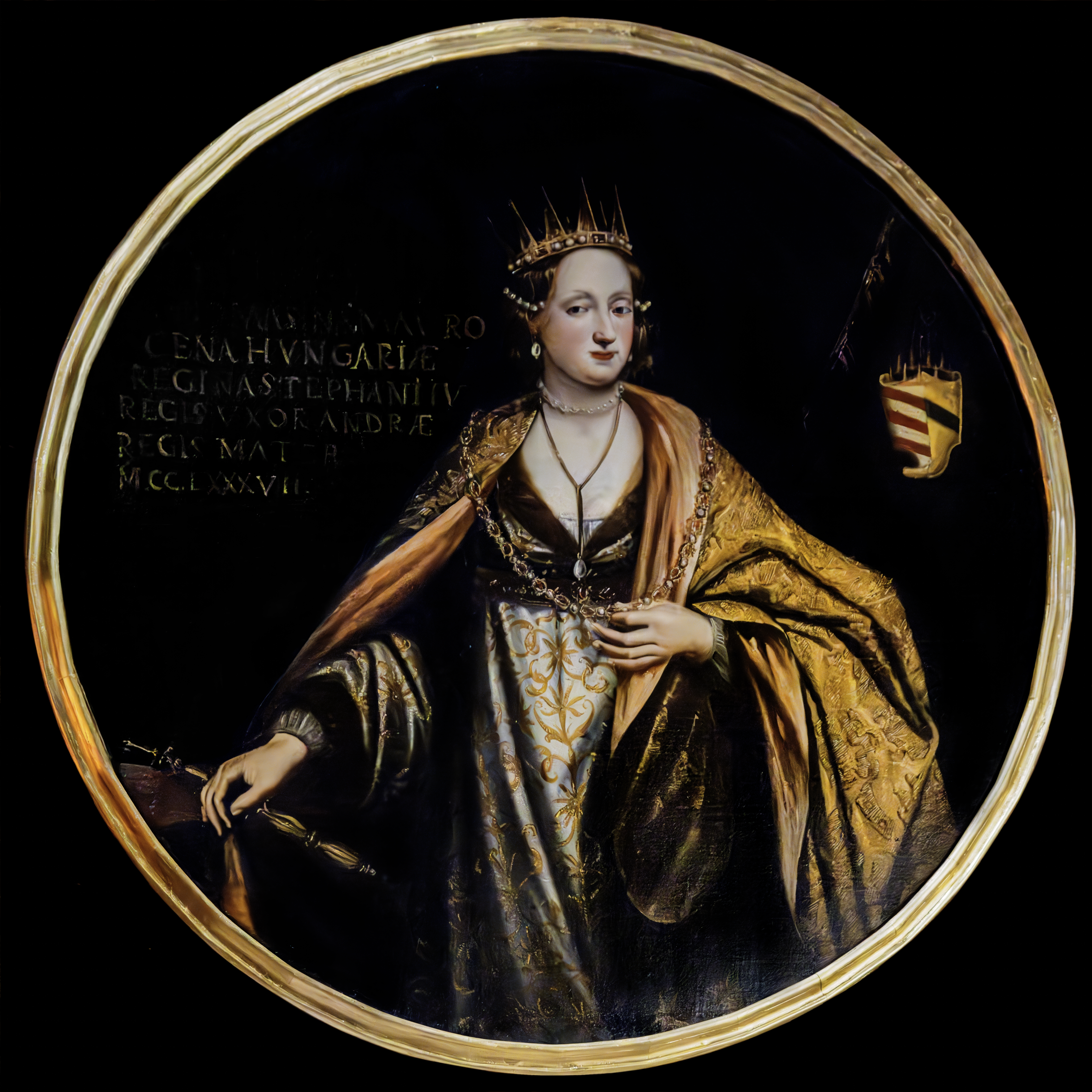
- 17th-century portrait of Tommasina Morosini by Chiara Varotari
- Born: c. 1250; Venice
- Died: 1296 or 1297 (aged c. 47); Hungary
- Noble family: Morosini
- Spouse: Stephen the Posthumous
- Issue: Andrew III of Hungary
- Father: Michele Morosini
- Mother: Agnese Cornaro

Tomasina Morosini (also Tommasina or Thomasina; c. 1250 – 1296 or 1297) was a 13th-century Venetian noblewoman and member of the powerful Morosini family. She was the mother of Andrew III, the last king of Hungary from the Árpád dynasty. After her son's accession to the throne, she moved to Hungary in 1292, where she served as Duchess of Slavonia until her death.

== Ancestry ==
Tomasina was born around 1250 into the influential and powerful Morosini family, as the daughter of Michele Morosini, a patrician of Venice, who was podestà of Faenza in 1240. Her mother was Agnese Cornaro, of the "dalla Sbarra" branch of the House of Cornaro. When Tomasina was born, her grandfather Marino Morosini was the incumbent Doge of Venice from 1249 to 1253. Tomasina had a brother Albertino, also an influential Venetian governor of several cities since the 1270s, and a sister Geneure.

== Marriage ==
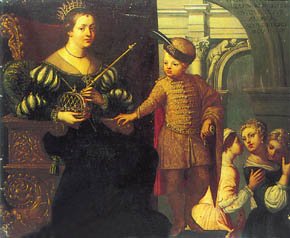
Tomasina with her son Andrew, in a pre-18th century painting

After his first wife and infant son died around 1263, Stephen the Posthumous left Ravenna for Venice. He was an exiled prince from the Árpád dynasty and a claimant to the Hungarian throne as the posthumous son of the late King Andrew II of Hungary, but his paternity was disputed by his brothers born from their father's earlier marriage and he was not recognized as heir presumptive to the Hungarian throne. Stephen throughout his life tried to gain support for his cause in the Italian peninsula. In Venice, he married Tomasina Morosini around 1264. With this marriage, Stephen acquired large wealth and political influence, since the Morosini family were one of the most prominent political dynasties in Venice. The Morosinis saw the establishment of a later fruitful trade relationship in the direction of Central Europe with the marriage. Despite Stephen was a foreigner, who held no Venetian citizenship, the Great Council of Venice approved his marriage with Tomasina, probably because in this way they could have offset the Hungarian claims over Dalmatia. According to Italian humanist Niccolò Leoniceno, Stephen was granted patrician status following their wedding, which took place at San Michele in Isola following the conclusion of the marriage contract at the Morosinis' palace near San Zulian.

The couple lived in the aforementioned palace thereafter. Later chronicles emphasize that despite the political nature of the marriage, love was present in the relationship between Stephen and Tomasina. Their only son Andrew was born around 1265. He was raised as a future king of Hungary at the Morosinis' household in Venice. Tomasina was a huge admirer of celebrations and singing performances, according to Casimir Freschot, who also styled her "Queen of Adriatic", a "new Esther" and "Violet Lady" in his chronicle. Stephen the Posthumous fell ill and died in 1271. In his last will, Stephen declared his minor son Andrew as his heir to his claims in Hungary and Italy (Slavonia and Este, respectively), and nominated Tomasina's two kinsmen, her brother Albertino Morosini and brother-in-law Marino Gradenigo, as Andrew's guardians. Following Stephen's death, the grieving widow Tomasina girded her coat of arms with a black mourning veil, which she used for the rest of her life.

== Queen mother ==
Following the death of her husband, Tomasina's brother Albertino Morosini took over the upbringing of the child Andrew. The uncle ensured Andrew's rights to the inheritance of Stephen's first wife, Isabella Traversari, daughter of a powerful Ravennate family. Tomasina supported her son's claim to the Hungarian throne. Upon the invitation of some Hungarian lords, Andrew, adopting the title of Duke of Slavonia, acted as a pretender to the throne against Ladislaus IV of Hungary (r. 1272–1290) in 1278 and 1286–1287, adopting the title Duke of Slavonia, but he soon returned to Venice after the unsuccessful attempts. Following the murder of Ladislaus IV in July 1290, Andrew remained the last male member of the Árpád dynasty. He was elected and crowned king of Hungary shortly thereafter, but it took him more than a year to consolidate his power against Albert I, Duke of Austria and the rival claimant Capetian House of Anjou.

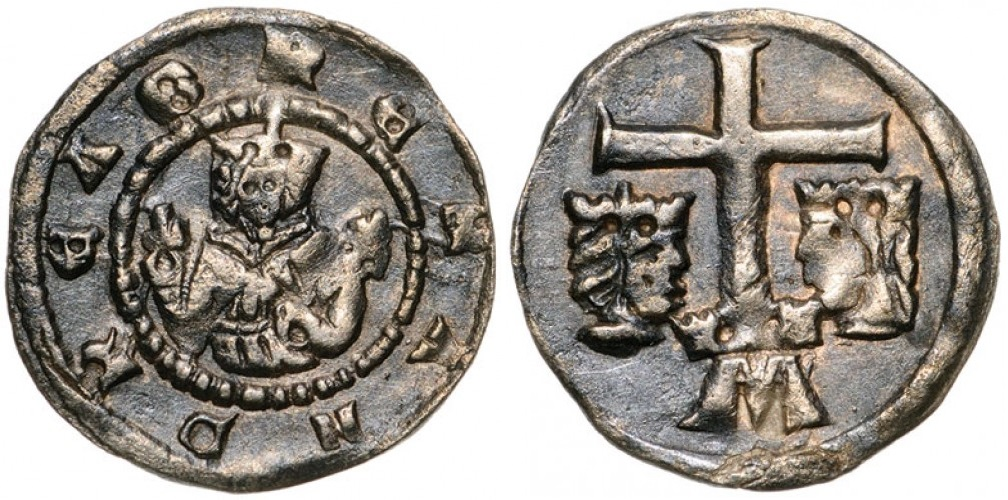
Coin of Andrew III, the reverse of which (right) depicts the king and his mother Tomasina facing each other with the queen mother's initial "M"

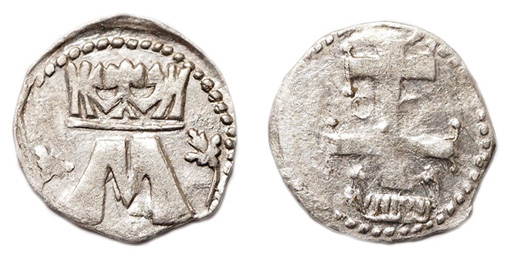
Coin of Andrew III with the initial "M", which refers to his mother Tomasina

Andrew III invited his mother to Hungary following the ratification of the Peace of Hainburg which concluded the 1291 Austrian–Hungarian war. Meanwhile, the Republic of Venice decided to send an official delegation to Hungary, headed by her maternal uncle, Giovanni Cornaro, to accompany Tomasina to the kingdom in September 1291. It is possible that Andrew's former tutor, Marco da Saliceto belonged to Tomasina' entourage too. The Venetian ships were heading for Zadar, where the delegation of Trogir would have joined them and the local citizens paid homage to Queen Tomasina. However, the ships of the delegation spent a long time wandering off the coast of Dalmatia in the following months, because of the piracy activity of the Šubići, partisans of the rival Angevins. In May 1292, the Great Council instructed the delegation, that if they cannot continue their journey within weeks (it is plausible that they were unable to leave Zadar securely), they should return to the lagoons of Venice. The delegation was finally able to continue their journey and Andrew III sent his confidant Ugrin Csák to Primorje in order to escort his mother Tomasina to Hungary, but he was captured and imprisoned by certain "disloyal barons". He was freed from captivity by Radoslav Babonić upon the king's order, and Radoslav also accompanied the queen mother to Zagreb in July 1292, where Andrew III and his royal army joined them after the suppression of the Kőszegis' rebellion.

Initially, Tomasina had no official political role in Andrew's court and she was frequently styled as simply "the king's mother" (Latin: mater domini regis) in 1293. Nevertheless, she took part in decision making from the very beginning as one of the royal advisors of her son. Her position and legal claim was strengthened by the fact that silver denarii were minted with her initial letter "M" and a crown shortly after her arrival to Hungary. Among these coins, three varians are known, two of them depicts the king and his mother (with crown) facing each other, between them a cross with the crown and letter "M" at the bottom. Although she was never crowned formally a "queen mother", a separate queenly court had established around her person. For instance, she had her own count of the court (Atyusz Hahót), treasurer (Dominic Csák then Ladislaus Péc), chief steward (Lawrence Kórógyi) and cup-bearer (John Péc). Andrew III donated the queenly estate of Segesd in Somogy County and other possessions to Tomasina to cover the costs of her household, thus she benefited from the traditional queenly possessions. Only a non-authentic charter refers to her as "Duchess of Whole Slavonia and Lady of the Maritime Province" (Latin: ducissa totius Sclavonie et maritimarum partium principissa) with the date 1293. In this document, Andrew III made a gesture by naming Paul Šubić the hereditary ban of Croatia and Dalmatia on condition of faithful service to the king and his mother. Its authenticity is accepted by some Croatian historians. She styled himself simply "the king's mother" still in early 1295, when donated the estate Szob – a portion of the Segesd lordship prior to that – to ispán Ladislaus Tengerdi.

=== Duchess of Slavonia ===
According to historian Tamás Kádár, Andrew III entrusted her mother to administer the southwestern parts of the realm sometime in 1293. Dániel Bácsatyai considered that it occurred only in 1295. She first appears in this dignity in November 1295, when confirmed the ownership right of Conrad Győr over Geresd against the claim of Benedict, Bishop of Belgrade. Attila Zsoldos considered that Tomasina was created duchess sometime between April and November 1295, but already in 1294 there was an attempt to do so. Tomasina's full title was the "Duchess of the Whole of Slavonia and the Governor of the Provinces from the Danube to the Adriatic Coast" (Latin: ducissa totius Sclavonie et gubernatrix partium citra danubialium usque maritima); her duchess province covered the region "Slavonia" between the rivers Danube and Drava, through from Gvozd Mountain to the Adriatic Sea, while she administered the remaining attached territories with the title of governess. Soon, her court was established consisted of her original entourage from Italy and local Hungarian lords. For instance, she donated a customs place with the consent of her "own barons" in 1295.

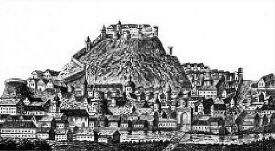
The medieval castle of Požega in Slavonia, Duchess Tomasina's seat

Tomasina ruled her province with sovereign authority and was mandated to defeat those powerful local lords who had aspirated to establish oligarchic domains in the region. Tomasina held her provincial seat at the fortress of Požega. Her jurisdiction extended to Baranya and Tolna counties in Transdanubia too. Tomasina's activity jeopardized the interests of Ugrin Csák, the most powerful lord in Upper Syrmia, who held Syrmia and Valkó counties firmly under his control, but Tomasina's duchy prevented his western expansion into Požega County. Tomasina's maritime province was also an area of permanent interest to the Republic of Venice. According to Slovak historian Martin Štefánik, the inhabitants in Dalmatia spoke to close to Venetian dialect, and local traditions and mentality (e.g. municipal autonomy) were also adopted from Venice, thus Tomasina was able to represent her son's interests by navigating the local conditions. In addition to Venice, the rival Angevins also attempted to build a circle of supporters in the region by contacting with the Dalmatian coastal cities.

Her appointment as Duchess of Slavonia caused opposition and rebellion among the local lords, but Tomasina proved to be a strong mainstay of the royal power. The Muslim-born brothers Mizse and Eyza, former partisans of the late Ladislaus IV, were among the local landowner nobles, who rebelled against Tomasina's rule. Eyza plundered the region of Baranya County, his men, John and Paul Véki, looted and destroyed Tomasina's personal estate Danóc (present-day a borough of Gajić in Croatia) too with its nearby monastery in Gecs, both defended by Provost Andronicus of Veszprém. Eyza and his men caused a damage of 1,000 marks to the provost, while his several servants were robbed or killed. Around the same time, in 1294 or 1295, Mizse occupied by force the royal fortress at Dunaszekcső and he refused to return it to the monarch or his mother. In response, Tomasina Morosini recruited an army; Palatine Nicholas Kőszegi, Paul Balog, Bishop of Pécs and Ladislaus Tengerdi also participated in the military campaign. Tomasina's troops successfully besieged and took the fort from Mizse. Thereafter, she handed over the fort to Andrew III. Radoslav Babonić also rebelled against the duchess in the same year; as a result she besieged and captured his castle of Orbászkő (ruins near present-day Vrbaška, Bosnia and Herzegovina). Tomasina also sent a reinforcement unit to the royal army of Andrew III, who marched to Tiszántúl to defeat Roland Borsa, the powerful Voivode of Transylvania.

== Death and legacy ==
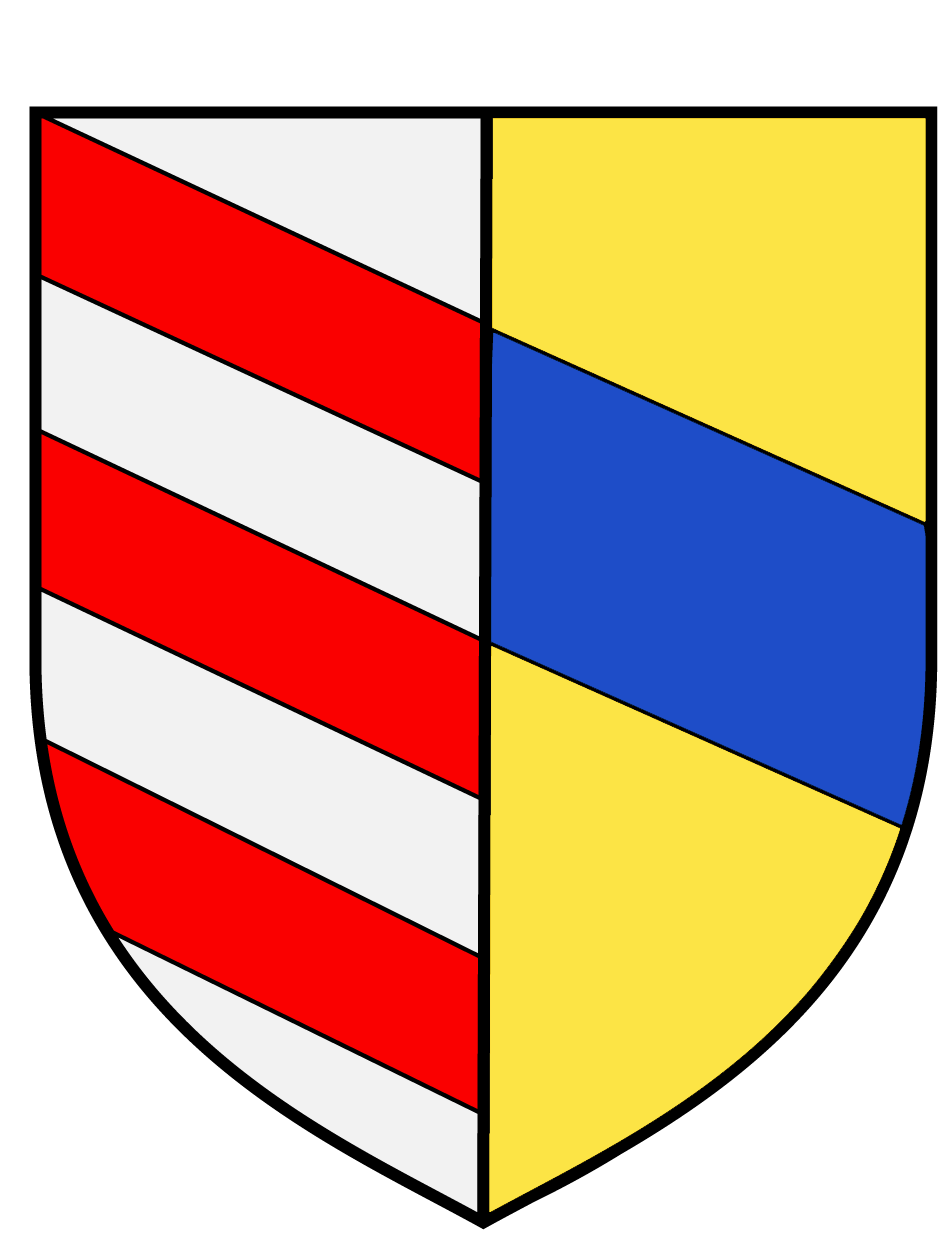
Arms of Tomasina Morosini, a combination of the Árpád and Morosini coats of arms

She died sometime between March 1296 and early 1297; Andrew III referred to her as "late" ("illustris recordationis matris nostre karissime") in his royal charter on 18 January 1297. Tomasina's death may have already taken place in the spring of 1296, since her confidant Marco da Saliceto resided in Mantua already in May in that year. Earlier historiography – based on a document being misdated – incorrectly considered that Tomasina died in late 1300, only months before the death of her son Andrew III. Contemporary Austrian chronicler Ottokar aus der Gaal claimed in his work Steirische Reimchronik ("Styrian Rhyming Chronicle") that Tomasina was poisoned, which caused her death. The poison of Italian origin was mixed into the gravy of a roast pheasant intended for her, after she similarly tried to kill an unidentified "count". Ottokar claimed that Andrew III was assassinated by poison too shortly thereafter. Although early historiography accepted this narration, there is no evidence that Tomasina was actually the victim of an assassination attempt.

After the death of Tomasina, her brother Albertino Morosini was invited to Hungary. Andrew installed him Duke of Slavonia and Count of Požega in 1297, and later he was accorded the status of a Hungarian nobleman by the national diet in 1298. Following his local rival Tomasina's death, Ugrin Csák acquired the whole Valkó County for himself.

Andrew III died on 14 January 1301, resulting the extinction of the Árpád dynasty and a decade-long interregnum in Hungary. Some Italian chronicles – for instance, 15th-century historian Donato Contarini – claimed that Tomasina outlived her son and returned to Venice. Donato writes that she spent her last years in the palace of her brother Albertino in the territory of San Zulian in the San Marco district, where she died in 1311 or 1315. A square in Venice (Campiello della Regina d'Ungheria) is named after Tomasina. A nearby house is called Casa di Tommasina Morosini, while the quay behind the house is also named after her (Fondamenta Morosini de la Regina), as well as a street in Verona (Vicolo della Regina d'Ungheira).

== Sources ==
=== Primary sources ===
- Gaal, Ottokar aus der (2023). Stájer rímes krónika [Styrian Rhyming Chronicle] (in Hungarian). Translated by Bagi, Dániel; Orsós, Júlia. Arpadiana XI., Research Centre for the Humanities. ISBN 978-615-5133-24-4.

=== Secondary sources ===
- Bácsatyai, Dániel (2023). "A széplelkű kamaraispán és más szerencselovagok. III. András olaszai [The Belletrist Chamber Ispán and other Adventurers. The Italians of Andrew III]". Századok (in Hungarian). 157 (6). Magyar Történelmi Társulat: 1171–1193. ISSN 0039-8098.
- Banfi, Florio (2005). Sárközy, Péter; Kovács, Zsuzsa; Horváth, Zoltán György (eds.). Itáliai magyar emlékek [Hungarian Memories in Italy] (in Hungarian). Romanika Kiadó. ISBN 978-963-87287-2-2.
- Galambosi, Péter (2017). "Csák Ugrin, a hűséges tartományúr [Ugrin Csák, the Loyal Provincial Lord]". Fons (in Hungarian). 24 (3). Szentpétery Imre Történettudományi Alapítvány: 289–322. ISSN 1217-8020.
- Kádár, Tamás (2018). "Az uralkodóházzal vérrokoni kapcsolatban nem álló előkelők hercegi titulusa és címhasználata a kora középkori Magyarországon [Ducal Title and Title Use of Nobles not related to the Royal Dynasty in Early Medieval Hungary]". Turul (in Hungarian). 91 (4). Magyar Heraldikai és Genealógiai Társaság: 121–131. ISSN 1216-7258.
- Kristó, Gyula (1979). A feudális széttagolódás Magyarországon [Feudal Anarchy in Hungary] (in Hungarian). Akadémiai Kiadó. ISBN 963-05-1595-4.
- Štefánik, Martin (2008). "The Morosinis in Hungary under King Andrew III and the two versions of the death of the Queen of Hungary Tommasina" (PDF). Historický Časopis. 56 (Supplement): 3–15. ISSN 0018-2575.
- Wertner, Mór (1892). Az Árpádok családi története [Family History of the Árpáds] (in Hungarian). Szabó Ferencz N.-eleméri plébános & Pleitz Fer. Pál Könyvnyomdája.
- Zsoldos, Attila (2003). "III. András". In Szovák, Kornél; Szentpéteri, József; Szakács, Margit (eds.). Szent István és III. András [Saint Stephen and Andrew III] (in Hungarian). Kossuth Kiadó. pp. 119–227. ISBN 963-09-4461-8.
- Zsoldos, Attila (2005a). Az Árpádok és asszonyaik. A királynéi intézmény az Árpádok korában [The Árpáds and their Women: The Institution of Queenship in the Era of the Árpáds] (in Hungarian). MTA Történettudományi Intézete. ISBN 963 8312 98 X.
- Zsoldos, Attila (2005b). "Ducissa Sclavonie [Duchess of Slavonia]". In Almási, Tibor; Draskóczy, István; Jancsó, Éva (eds.). Studia professoris–professor studiorum. Tanulmányok Érszegi Géza hatvanadik születésnapjára (in Hungarian). National Archives of Hungary. pp. 381–390. ISBN 963-631-173-0.
