= Požega County =

Historic county of the Kingdom of Croatia-Slavonia

Požega County Požeška županija Pozsega vármegye
- County of the Kingdom of Slavonia, Kingdom of Croatia-Slavonia and the Kingdom of Serbs, Croats and Slovenes
- 12th century–1920
- Coat of arms

- Location of the County (red) within the Kingdom of Croatia-Slavonia (white)
- Capital: Požega
- Area
  - Coordinates: 45°20′N 17°41′E
  - 1910: 4,933 km^{2} (1,905 sq mi)
- Population
  - 1910: 265,272
- History
  - Established: 12th century
  - Treaty of Trianon: 4 June 1920
- Today part of: Croatia

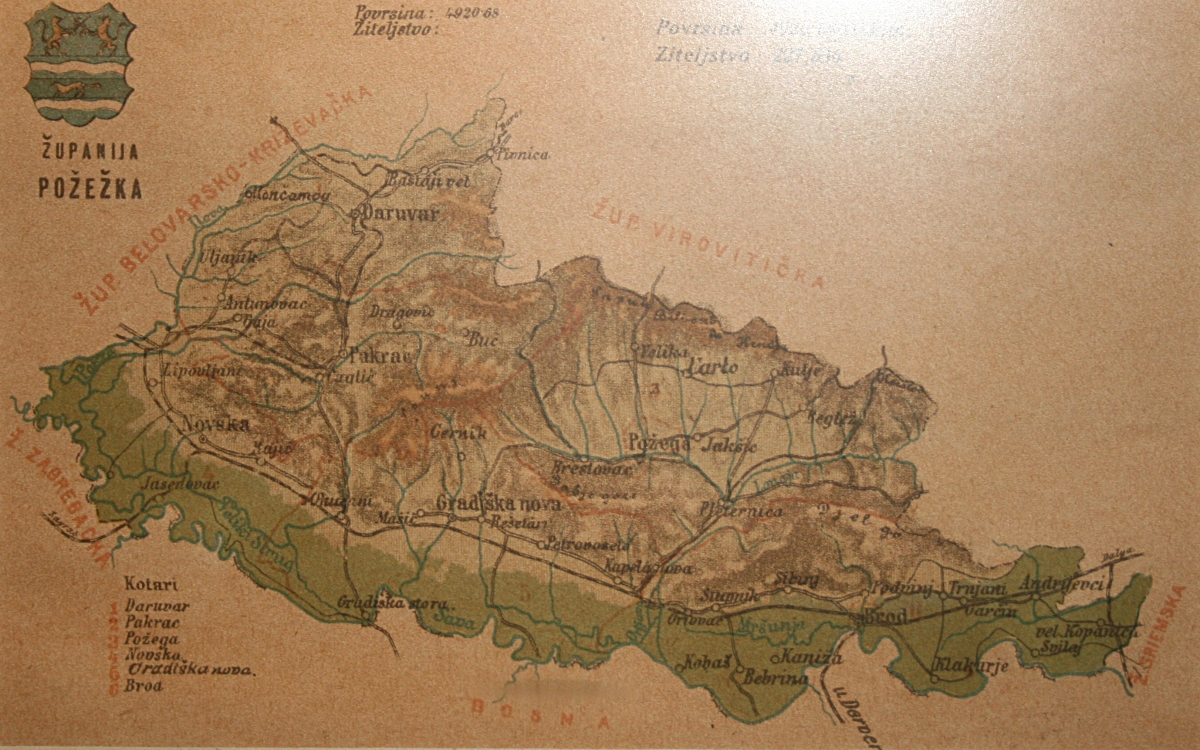
Old map of Požega County

Požega County (Croatian: Požeška županija; Hungarian: Pozsega vármegye) was a historic administrative subdivision (županija) of the Kingdom of Croatia-Slavonia. Croatia-Slavonia was an autonomous kingdom within the Lands of the Crown of Saint Stephen (Transleithania), the Hungarian part of the dual Austro-Hungarian Empire. Its territory is now in eastern Croatia. The capital of the county was Požega (Croatian, in Hungarian: Pozsega).

== Geography ==
Požega county shared borders with the Austrian land Bosnia-Herzegovina and the counties of Zagreb, Bjelovar-Križevci, Virovitica and Srijem (all in Croatia-Slavonia). The county stretched along the left (northern) bank of the river Sava. Its area was 4933 km^{2} around 1910.

== History ==
The territory of Požega County was part of the Kingdom of Croatia, a realm in personal union with the Kingdom of Hungary since 1102. Požega County was likely formed in the 12th century through partition of the Baranya County. The earliest historical record of Požega County as the comitatus de Posega survives from the a deed issued by king Andrew II of Hungary in 1210, confirming ownership of land left to the Knights Templar by the Palatine of Hungary Csépán Győr. The earliest surviving dated mention of the city of Požega (as castrum de Posega) dates to 11 January 1227 in a document issued by Pope Honorius III. The pope confirmed the decision of Andrew II granting the Archbishop of Kalocsa Ugrin Csák authority over Požega.

In 1232, Ugrin established a Cistercian abbey in Gotó (also referred to as the Honesta Vallis) in present-day Kutjevo where monks first arrived from Zirc Abbey. In the 12th century, Benedictine Rudina Abbey was established in the west of the valley containing the county seat by Ban Borić or one of his sons. According to historian Nada Klaić, Borić owned estates in the area, including the Orljava Fortress, at the time and was likely the first comes (appointed head) of Požega County. The Franciscans established an abbey in Požega itself in the second half of the 13th century. Since at least 1217, the Požega Capitulum of St. Peter (Požeški kaptol sv. Petra) was established as the place of authentication in present-day Kaptol likely by Ban of Croatia and Bishop of Pécs Kalán.

Ugrin died in the Battle of Mohi in 1241. Then, the title of county comes was awarded to Keled Kórógyi. He was killed the same year in battle with Mongols at the Orljava Fortress (near present-day Orljavac). The city of Požega was nonetheless held, and king Béla IV left ruling of Požega to his wife Maria Laskarina who ruled it for the rest of her life, until 1270. In the same period, it was recorded that the county comes is Philip, appointed judge by queen Maria in 1244–1266. Béla IV was succeeded by his son Stephen V who died two years later. His wife, queen consort Elizabeth the Cuman moved to Požega in 1272.

In 1293, three years after Elizabeth the Cuman died, Ugrin III Csák was granted the title of the comes of Požega County. In 1297, king Andrew III appointed his uncle and member of the Venetian noble Morosini family, Albertino Morosini the comes of the Požega County and the Duke of Slavonia. The king's mother Tomasina Morosini also stayed in Požega for an extended period, blocking Ugrin III's rule over Požega County. The Morosini's appointment led the Croatian nobility to revolt. A powerful Croatian baron, Paul Šubić, sent his brother, George, to Italy in early 1300 where he convinced Charles II of Naples to send his grandson Charles Robert to Hungary to claim the throne in person, setting up the dynastic struggle between the Capetian House of Anjou and the Árpád dynasty. After landing at Split in Dalmatia in August 1300, Paul Šubić escorted Charles Robert to Zagreb, where Ugrin III swore loyalty to Charles, who then granted him Požega Castle. When Andrew III died in 1301, the Árpád dynasty became extinct and Ugrin III successfully claimed Požega County as his domain by 1303 – along with Syrmia, Vuka, and Bács counties – and until his death in 1311. In early 14th century, Dujam II Frankopan became the comes of Požega County as the supporter of Charles Robert.

In 1385, king Louis I summoned Tvrtko I of Bosnia to Požega where he turned over the western parts of Zachumlia to Louis I as dowry for his marriage with Elizabeth of Bosnia. Following the death of Louis I, Požega was the venue of an inconclusive meeting of supporters and opponents of Elizabeth's daughter, queen Mary with the two queens. The Hungarian and Croatian nobility largely objected to any possibility of succession in the female line and supported the claim to the throne by Charles III of Naples as the last surviving male member of the Capetian branch of the Anjou family.

In 1409, Sigismund, Holy Roman Emperor, having prevailed in the fight for the Hungarian crown, gave Hrvoje Vukčić Hrvatinić, in return for his support in dynastic struggle for the Hungarian throne with the Capetian House of Anjou, various estates and titles including the city of Požega and appointed him the comes of the Požega County. The decision was reversed in 1413 when he fell out of the king's favour. In 1432–1437, Ladislaus Tamási was the comes of Požega County. His son Henrik held the same office in 1443 and 1444 – when he also held equivalent posts in Virovitica and Somogy counties. In 1445–1447, the position of comes of Požega County (along with possession of the castrum and patronage of the Rudina abbey) was granted by the royal court to Palatine Lőrinc Hédervári. He was succeeded by his son Henrik, the Duke of Macsó. Henrik was the comes of Požega County in 1447–1450 and 1464–1472. The late 15th century and the early 16th century saw the first incursions of the Ottoman Empire in the Požega County. Periods of fighting were broken with stable periods of peacetime, each associated with a powerful comes of the county. Those were the Ladislaus of Ilok, Lawrence of Ilok, and Franjo Dessewffy.

By the time of 1527 election in Cetin and the start of rule of the House of Habsburg, the Požega County became defunct as only three Croatian counties remained due to territorial losses to the Ottoman Empire – Zagreb, Varaždin, and Križevci counties. Namely, the territory of the county was lost to the Ottoman conquests during the Hundred Years' Croatian–Ottoman War, and the city of Požega was captured by the Ottomans in 1537. The Požega County was re-established in 1745 after Ottoman territorial gains in the area were reversed during the Ottoman–Habsburg wars. In 1920, by the Treaty of Trianon the county became part of the newly formed Kingdom of Serbs, Croats and Slovenes (later renamed to Yugoslavia). Since 1991, when Croatia became independent from Yugoslavia, the county is part of Croatia.

== Demographics ==
In 1900, the county had a population of 229,361 people and was composed of the following linguistic communities:

Total:

- Croatian: 124,207 (54.2%)
- Serbian: 58,905 (25.6%)
- Hungarian: 13,762 (6.0%)
- German: 12,965 (5.7%)
- Slovak: 1,245 (0.5%)
- Romanian: 269 (0.1%)
- Ruthenian: 181 (0.1%)
- Other or unknown: 17,827 (7.8%)

According to the census of 1900, the county was composed of the following religious communities:

Total:

- Roman Catholic: 161,883 (70.6%)
- Greek Orthodox: 59,332 (25.9%)
- Lutheran: 3,216 (1.4%)
- Jewish: 2,390 (1.0%)
- Calvinist: 2,270 (1.0%)
- Greek Catholic: 217 (0.1%)
- Unitarian: 1 (0.0%)
- Other or unknown: 52 (0.0%)

In 1910, the county had a population of 265,272 people and was composed of the following linguistic communities:

Total:

- Croatian: 142,616 (53.76%)
- Serbian: 66,783 (25.18%)
- Hungarian: 16,462 (6.21%)
- German: 13,143 (4.95%)
- Slovak: 3,352 (1.26%)
- Romanian: 154 (0.06%)
- Ruthenian: 2,888 (1.09%)
- Other or unknown: 19,874 (7.49%) (Note: Most of them (15,149) Czech)

According to the census of 1910, the county was composed of the following religious communities:

Total:

- Roman Catholic: 185,896 (70.1%)
- Greek Orthodox: 67,273 (25.4%)
- Lutheran: 3,410 (1.3%)
- Calvinist: 3,227 (1.2%)
- Greek Catholic: 2,986 (1.1%)
- Jewish: 2,432 (0.9%)
- Unitarian: 5 (0.0%)
- Other or unknown: 43 (0.0%)

== Subdivisions ==
In the early 20th century, the subdivisions of Pozsega county were:

Districts
District	Capital
Slavonski Brod	Slavonski Brod
Daruvar	Daruvar
Novska	Novska
Pakrac	Pakrac
Požega	Požega
Nova Gradiška	Nova Gradiška
Urban districts
Slavonski Brod
Požega

== Literature ==
- Taube, Friedrich Wilhelm von (1777). Historische und geographische Beschreibung des Königreiches Slavonien und des Herzogthumes Syrmien. Vol. 1. Leipzig.
- Taube, Friedrich Wilhelm von (1777). Historische und geographische Beschreibung des Königreiches Slavonien und des Herzogthumes Syrmien. Vol. 2. Leipzig.
- Taube, Friedrich Wilhelm von (1778). Historische und geographische Beschreibung des Königreiches Slavonien und des Herzogthumes Syrmien. Vol. 3. Leipzig.
