= Pazos in Pontevedra and Terra de Montes =

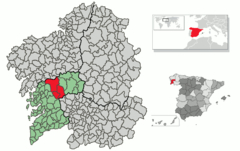
Map of Pontevedra and Terra de Montes

Pazos are big country houses that were built in the 16th century by the richest families of that time, most of them are found in Galicia, Spain. Normally, each family owned several houses to host their relatives. Each house has a shield in which are represented the symbols of all the families that owned the pazo. The importance of the family depended on the numbers of Pazos they owned. Nowadays most of these houses are abandoned or used as a museum. Only a few of them are inhabited. The most important Pazos in the area are San Marco, Vista Alegre, Torre, Toxeiriña and Buzaca.

== Los Amigos de los pazos ==
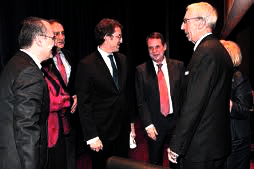
Some of the members of the association

Los amigos de los pazos (The friends of the Pazos) is an association formed by the owners of the pazos. It was created in 1972. Its principal target is to preserve and take care of all the pazos in Galicia. The greatest moment for this association took place when, in 1984, they were invited to the Council of Europe. The association was given a prize because of their work in The Way of St. James. The association host the travellers in the pazos.

Board of directors

- Honor President: Mr. Juan Manuel López-Chaves Meléndez
- President: Mrs. Delfina Cendón Orge
- 1st Vice-president: Mr. Grato Amor Moreno
- 2nd Vice-presidentª: Mrs. Montserrat Maneiro Bofill
- Secretary: Mrs. Eva Martínez Paz
- Treasurer: Mr. Benjamín Rodríguez Caneda

== Pazo of San Marco ==
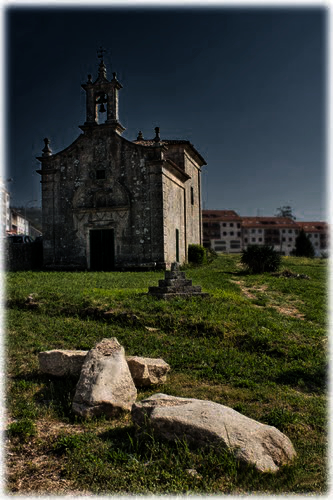
Pazo of San Marco

This pazo is the most characteristic and important in the area. A gate gives access to a courtyard through which you come to a stone staircase leading to the upper units. The estate, of good dimensions, includes a chapel, exclusive for the family.

It was built in 1696 by the “Castro” family, which was one of the richest families in that time. The house is irregularly conserved, part of the building is in good conditions but the rest needs to be repaired. The shield is situated in the entrance of the house. Inside it are the symbol of the families Castro, Camaño y Gil, which are the owners of the pazo.

== Pazo of Vista Alegre ==
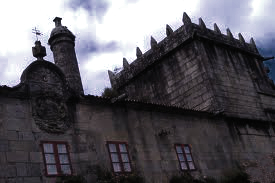
Pazo of Vista Alegre

Pazo Vista Alegre is situated in Councello, a small town in Pontevedra. It has an L shape, like most of the pazos in this area. Next to the building there is a raised granary, very common in all the pazos in Galicia as well, they were used to store food.

In its first years since it was built it was considered one of the biggest and most beautiful houses in the area. This house is from the last years of the 16th century and it belonged to the Castro family. In the 17th century, after being ruined, it was restored. Although it is one of the oldest pazos, it is very well conserved. Throughout the years, all the owners of this pazo have taken care of it, this made possible that nowadays, some members of Castro family live in it. In the shield of this pazo, situated next to the principal door, we can see the symbols of Castro and Camaño, families of the original owners.

== Pazo of Torre ==
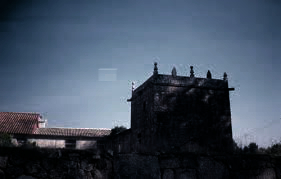
Pazo of Torre

This Pazo is located in Porranes. It is one of the littlest and less important Pazos in the area. This little house has a large estate which includes a dovecote and a raised granary(a storehouse where the supplies were kept, it was in a high place to avoid animals). It is believed that the Pazo had an original Chapel, but nowadays it is destroyed. The principal gate of the entrance is the best preserve place. There is placed the coat of arms.

There aren't many historical facts about this house. It is known that it belonged to the Pazo of San Marco, which was the important and well known in the area. Although most of the Pazo is ruined in the last years, The Pazo of Torre is going to be restored The semicircular coat of arms is in the imposing gate. The coat of arms has de surnames of the Castro, Caamaño, Mosquera y Gil. This surnames can be also found in other coats of arms from the rest of the Pazos

== Pazo Toxeiriña ==
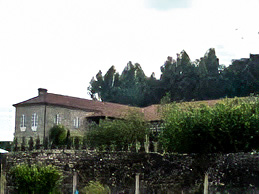
Pazo of Toixeriña

This is the less important Pazo in the area. It is placed in the town of Moraña. The Pazo is formed by a big house with a large balcony that pass through the house with a right angle. In one of the sides is the Chapel and in front of it the raised granary. The whole enclosure is surrounded by a wall and the estate stands out because of its beautiful and enormous garden. The Pazo of Toixeriña is very well preserve, thanks to the work that the Friends of the Pazos have made. They are always worried about them. The coats of arms is on one of the walls of the house and contains the surnames Goicochea and Varela.

== Pazo of Buzaca ==
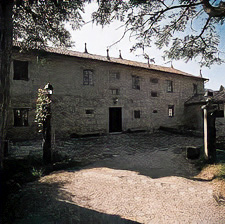
Pazo of Buzaca

The Pazo of Buzaca is in the parish of San Lorenzo, Moraña(Pontevedra). It is formed by a rectangular building which has many rooms, and the cover is decorated with pyramidal shapes. In the entrance, there is a large gate where the coat of arms is. In the estate it is also the chapel, which communicates the house by a covered corridor, two big raised granaries, dovecote and a tower, which are very old. All that is in an enclosure surrounded by a wall. The whole estate is protected by the mountains that are around the valley where the Pazo is. This pazo is considered as an original Pazo, because all its owners have had the surname Varela. The state of preservation of this Pazo is enviable thanks to the Varela Family, the actual owners, who have done detailed renovation. The coat of arms contains the surname Varela, Aguiar and Figueroa and a siren hug them. It also has a crown and it's very well decorated.
