= Giovanni Cornaro =

Giovanni Cornaro (also known as Giovanni Corner) may refer to:

- Giovanni Cornaro (diplomat) (fl. 1238–1291), Venetian diplomat
- Giovanni I Cornaro (1551–1629), Doge of Venice 1625–1629
- Giovanni II Cornaro (1647–1722), Doge of Venice 1709–1722
- Giovanni Cornaro (cardinal) (1720–1789), Italian cardinal
