= Stephen of Hungary (disambiguation) =

Stephen I of Hungary (c. 975 – 1038) was the last Grand Prince of the Hungarians and the first King of Hungary.

Stephen of Hungary may also refer to:

- Géza, Grand Prince of the Hungarians, whose baptismal name was Stephen
- Stephen II of Hungary
- Stephen III of Hungary
- Stephen IV of Hungary
- Stephen V of Hungary
- Stephen the Posthumous
- Stephen, Duke of Slavonia
- Archduke Stephen, Palatine of Hungary
