= Oratorio di Sant'Angelo degli Zoppi =

Church building in Venice, Italy

Coordinates: 45°26′4″N 12°19′54″E

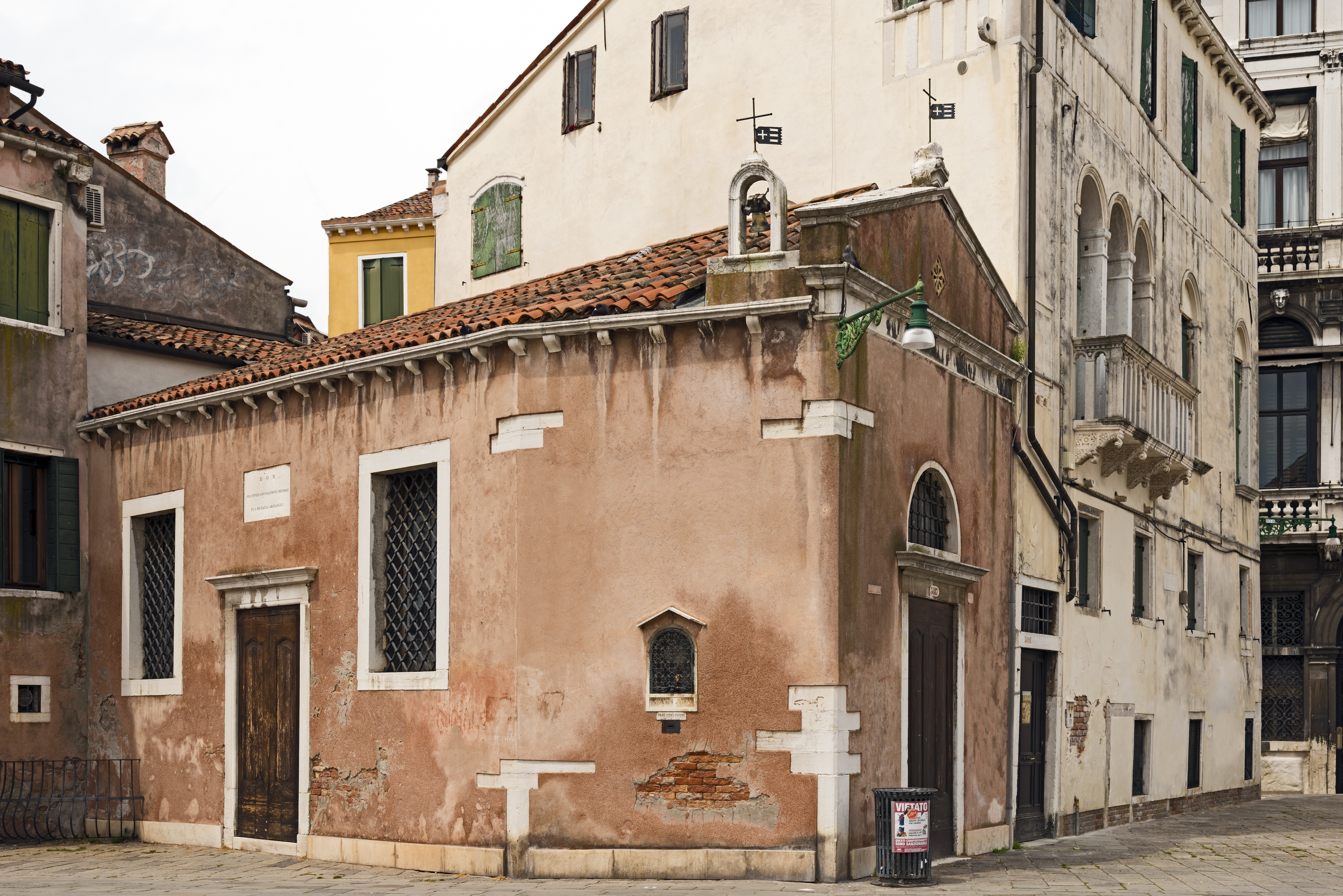
Oratory of Sant'Angelo degli Zoppi

San Angelo degli Zoppi is a Gothic-style oratory or prayer hall, located in Campo Sant'Angelo in the Sestiere of San Marco, in Venice, Italy.

== Description ==
The oratory was founded by the Morosini family before the year 1000, and dedicated to St Gabriel Archangel. It has also been called the Oratorio della Beata Vergine e di San Michele, and Oratorio dell'Annuziata. It contains paintings depicting an Annunciation by Antonio Triva, a Blind newborn by Sante Peranda, a Birth of Mary by Giuseppe Cesari, and a Via Crucis by Vincenzo Cherubini.

== See also ==
- Catholic Church in Italy
