= Constanza Morosini =

Italian Queen of Serbian noblewoman

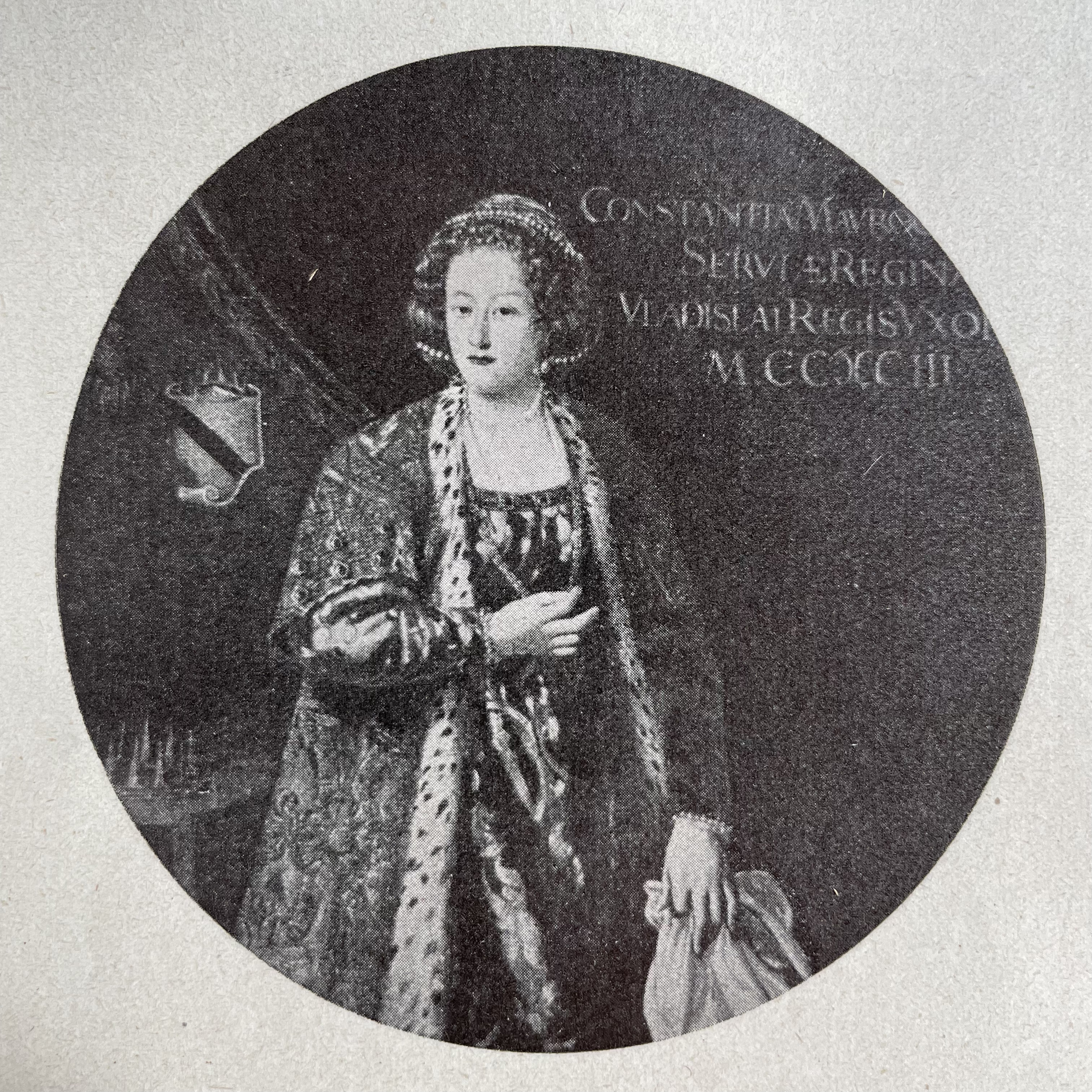
Portrait of Constanza Morosini

Constanza Morosini (Serbian: Констанца Морозини; 1275–1324) was a Venetian noblewoman, from the aristocratic Morosini family. By marriage, she was the Duchess of Slavonia, and the Queen of Serbia (Serviae Regina).

== Biography ==
In 1293, she married Serbian prince Stefan Vladislav II, from the Nemanjić dynasty, who was at that time the titular Duke of Slavonia, and later a Serbian king-pretender (twice, in 1316 and 1321) to the Serbian royal throne, and also ruled as the Lord of Syrmia.

She was the granddaughter of Albertino Morosini. Constanza, a Catholic, married Vladislav, an Eastern Orthodox, but kept her faith. It is unknown if Constanza had issue by her spouse.

== Sources ==
- Ćirković, Sima (2004). The Serbs. Malden: Blackwell Publishing.
- Fine, John Van Antwerp Jr. (1994) [1987]. The Late Medieval Balkans: A Critical Survey from the Late Twelfth Century to the Ottoman Conquest. Ann Arbor, Michigan: University of Michigan Press.
- Krstić, Aleksandar R. (2016). "The Rival and the Vassal of Charles Robert of Anjou: King Vladislav II Nemanjić" (PDF). Banatica. 26 (2): 33–51. Archived from the original on 2022-11-30.
- Tencajoli, Oreste Ferdinando (1933). Principesse Italiane nella storia d'altri paesi. Modernissima Libreria Internazionale.
- Živković, Vojislav (2021). Serbian Kings Dragutin and Milutin. The Problem of the Succession of the Serbian Throne at the End of the 13th and Beginning of the 14th Century. Niš & Vranje: Centar za crkvene studije; Svepravoslavno društvo Prepodobni Justin Ćelijski i Vranjski. ISBN 978-86-84105-59-4.
