= Albertino Morosini =

13th-century Venetian statesman

- Duke of Slavonia; Count of Požega
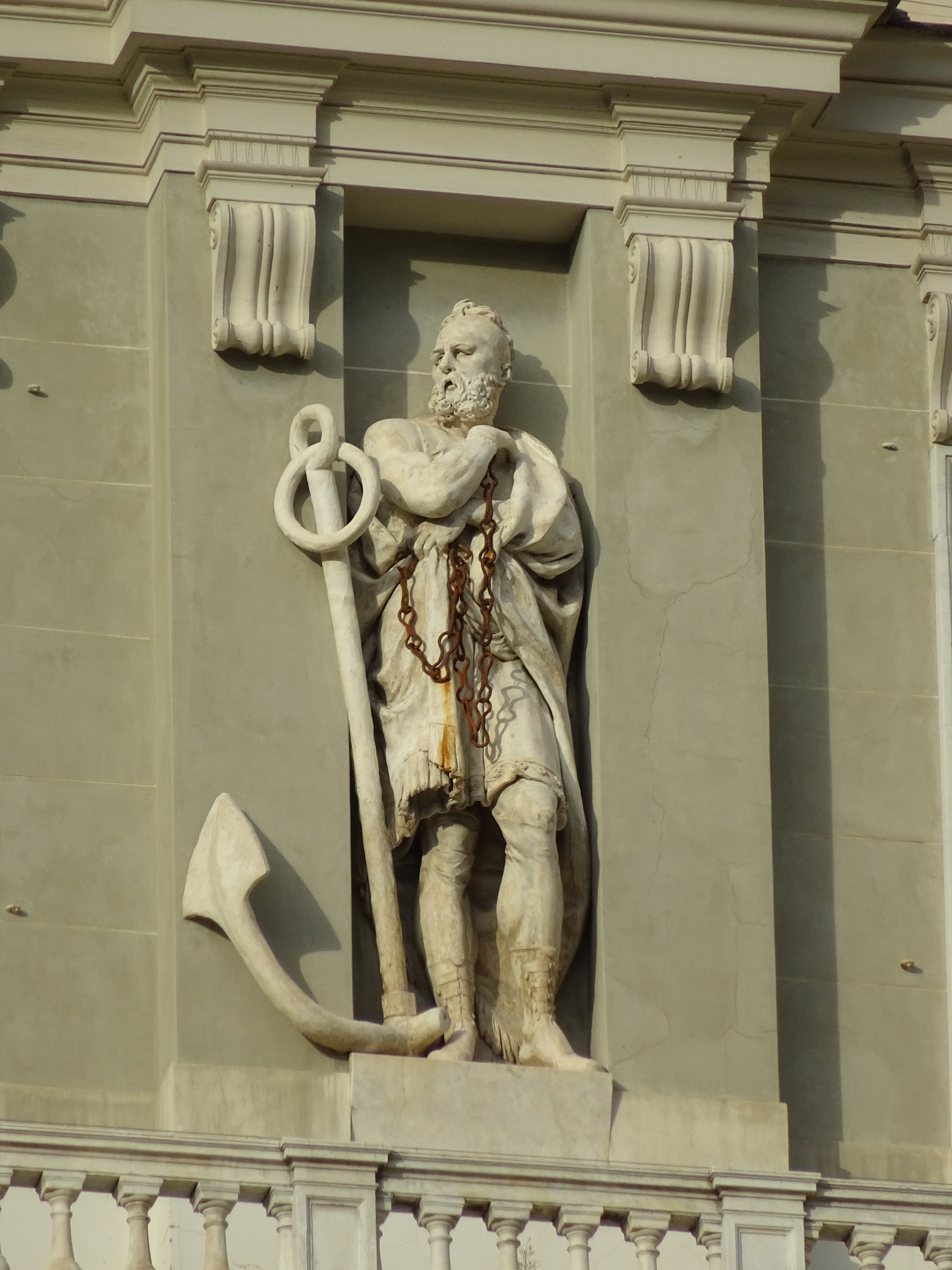
- Statue representing Morosini as a captive, from the 18th-century façade of the Doge's Palace of Genoa
- Born: c. 1240
- Died: 16 November 1305; Republic of Venice
- Buried: Santi Giovanni e Paolo
- Noble family: Morosini
- Spouse: Marchesina N
- Issue: Michele; Marino; Cubitosa; Caterina; Tommasina (natural)
- Father: Michele Morosini
- Mother: Agnese Cornaro

Albertino Morosini (c. 1240 – 16 November 1305) was a Venetian nobleman and statesman of the late 13th and early 14th centuries. He was elected governor (podestà) of the Republic of Pisa until his defeat and capture by the Genoese at the Battle of Meloria in 1284. He served in high offices in the Venetian Republic, including as bailo in Acre and Duke of Crete, where he confronted the Revolt of Alexios Kallergis. After 1290 was mostly active in the Kingdom of Hungary, where the son of his sister Tomasina became King Andrew III. Albertino entered the high Hungarian nobility, and was created Duke of Slavonia and Count of Požega, as well as being given a claim to the Hungarian succession. He returned to Venice after the death of Andrew III in 1301.

== Life ==
=== Early life in Venetian service ===
Albertino Morosini's early life is obscure. He was likely born in the 1230s or early 1240s. His father was Michele Morosini, who served as governor (podestà) of Faenza in 1240, and his mother was Agnese Cornaro, of the "dalla Sbarra" branch of the House of Cornaro. He had two sisters, Geneure and Tommasina. A number of brothers—Paolo, Giovanni, Marino, Tommaso, and Albano—are also ascribed to this family by later Venetian genealogies, but no documentary evidence has emerged to support this.

Albertino Morosini is first attested as a member of the Great Council of Venice in 1261. (Note: Due to reasons of age, he is unlikely to have been the same as the namesake who was Podestà of Constantinople in 1238 and Duke of Crete in 1255–1257.) He held a seat there several times until 1283, a testament to the prominence and wealth of his family. In 1274–1276, he also served as the Venetian governor of Zara (Count of Zara) in Dalmatia. During his tenure, he promoted agricultural reform and the cultivation of abandoned land. In August 1274 he helped bring about a treaty between Venice and the piratical town of Almissa, aided by the pressure put on the town by the anti-piracy campaigns launched by Charles I of Anjou. In 1277–1278, Morosini served as the Venetian representative (bailo) in Acre. With the help of the Templar Knights, he concluded a treaty with the Lordship of Tyre in July 1277. The agreement restored the Venetian community and privileges in Tyre that had been abolished in 1257 as a result of the War of Saint Sabas, and was, in part at least, also directed against the ambitious Charles I of Anjou, who in the same year had acquired the title of King of Jerusalem and sought to extend his influence of the Christian states of the Levant.

In 1278–1279 Morosini served in the Great Council. In 1280–1281 he served as podestà of Treviso, concluding a treaty with Venice over the division of estates in San Cataldo. He was elected to another tenure in the Great Council in 1283, and participated in a special commission for the revision of the 1277 agreement with Tyre. Morosini was then elected podestà of Chioggia, but his tenure was cut short when he was elected podestà of the Republic of Pisa in January 1284.

=== Podestà of Pisa and further career in Venice ===
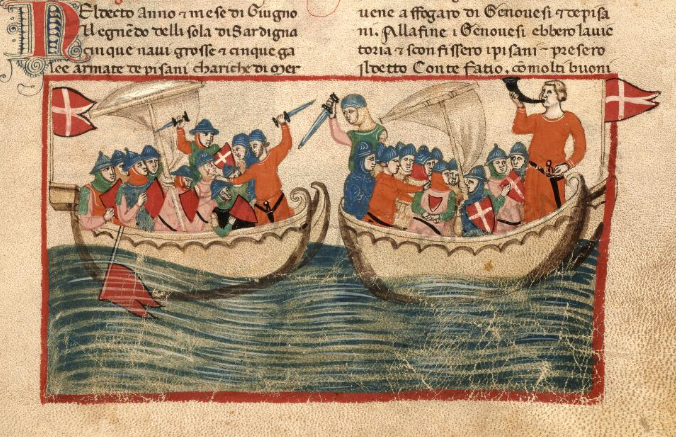
The Battle of Meloria, from a 14th-century illuminated chronicle

Morosini arrived in Pisa in March, accompanied by his son, Marino (erroneously called Martino by the Pisan sources). Morosini's election came at a time of rising tensions between Pisa and its rival, the Republic of Genoa. In June, Morosini was appointed 'lord-general of the war at sea' against Genoa, while Marino undertook to serve as his deputy in the governance of the city. The choice of Morosini by the Pisans has been the subject of considerable debate among medieval and modern historians. Most consider it a means by the Pisans for securing Venetian backing against the Genoese, who were also rivals of Venice. In view of the eventual conflict, the opinion has been voiced that he was selected for naval expertise, but nothing in his prior career points to that. At the same time, his appointment was part of a trend of central and northern Italian communes selecting Venetians as their podestàs.

In summer of the same year, Morosini led a Pisan fleet of 72 galleys in a surprise attack against the Genoese. The endeavour failed due to bad weather, and the Pisans moved towards the French coast, before turning back east and making for their home port. At the island of Meloria, off the Tuscan coast, the Pisan fleet met their Genoese rivals, with 66 galleys. In the ensuing battle, the Genoese received reinforcements of further 30 vessels, securing a crushing victory: 10,000 prisoners were taken, including a wounded Morosini. Venice sent an embassy to Genoa on 19 August, pleasing for his release; the Genoese complied, in exchange for an oath that he would not return to Pisa. His son, Marino, remained as deputy podestà in the city until Ugolino della Gherardesca replaced him on 18 October.

Back in Venice, Morosini resumed his seat in the Great Council. In 1285, he was involved in the ratification of a peace treaty with the Byzantine Empire. He was a member of a Venetian legation in 1286, which was mandated to re-establish and secure Venice's trade routes from Central Europe (strata Theutonicorum and strata Ungarorum), which were blocked in the wars against the Patriarchate of Aquileia. In 1287 he was sent to Crete as its governor (Duke of Crete), confronting the Revolt of Alexios Kallergis. In the second half of 1290 he was again podestà of Chioggia.

Morosini made a large fortune from his land holdings. According to a contract from 1286, Florentine banking houses lent him large amounts of Venetian denarii to exchange the amount for local solidi in the markets of Provence in France. Morosini remained in debt, so the family jewels pledged were sold by the creditors; but since the Florentines still did not recover the full amount, in 1291 they personally visited him in his Venetian palace, who simply threw them out amid threats.

=== Involvement in Hungary ===
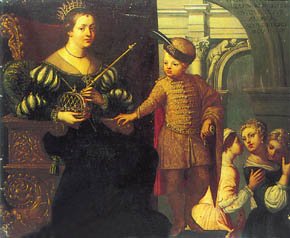
Albertino's sister, Tommasina Morosini, with her son Andrew III, King of Hungary

Morosini's sister Tommasina had married in second marriage Stephen, the posthumous son of King Andrew II of Hungary (r. 1205–1235), who lived in exile in Italy. The couple had a son, also named Andrew, and when Stephen died in 1271, Albertino and another kinsman Marino Gradenigo took over as Andrew's guardian. Among other affairs, Morosini ensured Andrew's rights to the inheritance of Stephen's first wife, Isabella Traversari, daughter of a powerful Ravennate family. Upon the invitation of some Hungarian lords, Andrew, adopting the title of Duke of Slavonia, acted as a pretender to the throne against Ladislaus IV of Hungary (r. 1272–1290) in 1278 and 1286–1287. His mother Tommasina and uncle Albertino Morosini supported his efforts in Hungary. During Andrew's first attempt in 1278, Morosini came to Hungary for the first time to visit his nephew in the company of a certain Gyarmanus, a local Slavonian lord, who guided him back to his homeland. In the spring of 1286, Andrew sought assistance from the Great Council of Venice in order to support his case in the kingdom. In June 1286, while engaged in the Venetian legation trying to re-open the trade routes, Morosini traveled to Duino to make a marriage proposal between Andrew and Clara, the daughter of Albert I of Gorizia (r. 1258–1304).

In early 1290, Andrew again entered Hungary. Morosini escorted him until Zara before returning to Venice. After the assassination of Ladislaus IV in July 1290, Andrew became King of Hungary as Andrew III (r. 1290–1301), an event which drastically changed Morosini's fortunes. Based on the narration of the near-contemporary Steirische Reimchronik, it is possible that Albertino Morosini, representing his nephew, took part in the negotiations in the summer of 1291, which ended the Austrian–Hungarian war in that year. Mór Wertner even considered that Venetian auxiliary troops fought on Andrew's side during the war, under the leadership of Morosini. However, Morosini stayed in Venice in June–August 1291, according to contemporary documents. Following Andrew's victory over Duke Albert of Austria, the Republic of Venice acknowledged Andrew's legitimacy. In September 1291, they sent a diplomatic delegation to Hungary, led by Albertino Morosini and Giovanni Cornaro, the maternal uncle of Queen Tommasina, who also arrived to Hungary with them. The envoys were mandated to confirm trade agreements between the two countries. The delegation, equipped with gifts, set sail on twenty-four horses, and each of the high-ranking ambassadors took four servants with them, alongside chefs, stewards and notaries.

In 1293, his granddaughter Constanza married Stefan Vladislav II (r. 1316–1325), the son and heir of the King of Syrmia, Stefan Dragutin (r. 1282–1316). Albertino Morosini served as captain of Istria and podestà of Capo d'Istria or Justinopolis (present-day Koper, Slovenia) in 1296. Following the death of Tommasina in late 1296 or early 1297, Albertino Morosini arrived to Hungary, now only representing his own interests and not the interests of the Republic of Venice. Andrew III raised Morosini to the Duchy of Slavonia and the County of Požega in 1297. He and his descendants were accorded the status of a Hungarian nobleman by the national diet in 1298. Several historians considered that Andrew III named him heir after his own sons in 1299. Other opinion emphasize, however, that the royal charter expressly emphasizes that inheritance does not affect the royal dignity, only the Duchy of Slavonia and the perpetual ispánate of Požega County. The monarch reconciled with the rebellious Babonići and appointed their head Stephen as Ban of Slavonia in order to weaken the supporters of the rival claimant Capetian House of Anjou upon the advice and consent of Morisini in 1299.

=== Final years and death ===
Andrew's death in 1301, and the subsequent interregnum and civil war over the Hungarian crown rendered Morosini's influence and rights more theoretical than real, although he took care to have them confirmed by papal legate Niccolò Boccasini (the future Pope Benedict XI) and even repeated them in his testament. According to the 15th-century Venetian chronicler Donato Contarini, Morisini's estates and properties were confiscated shortly after his nephew's death. Indeed, one of the Hungarian oligarchs that took power in the interregnum, Ugrin Csák, captured the fort of Požega already in the early months of 1301. Despite his alleged status as de facto heir per the aforementioned 1299 decision, Albertino Morosini did not take a step in the direction of announcing his claim to the Hungarian throne. Albertino returned to the Republic of Venice still in that year. Contarini claimed that Tommasina outlived her son and left Hungary too at the same time. Albertino had a palace built in the San Marco district and the queen spent the last years of her life and died there.

His testament, dated 15 November 1305, is the last information about Morosini. In his last will, Morosini styled himself Duke of Slavonia and Count of Požega, both positions are considered inheritable titles by himself despite his departure from Hungary. He died a day after making his last testament, on 16 November. The procuratores (executors) of the last testament were Gradonicus Dandulo and Phiofius Mauroceno, among others. His tomb is in the church of Santi Giovanni e Paolo in Venice. According to his last testament, he decreed that the tombstone to be erected should depict the holy Hungarian royalties, Stephen I, Emeric, Ladislaus I and Elizabeth. However, this decoration was never completed.

== Family ==
Albertino Morosini was married to a Marchesina, of unknown family. The couple had four children: two sons, Michele (the father of Constanza) and Marino (who had died by 1305), and two daughters, Cubitosa and Caterina. Albertino also had a natural daughter, Tommasina. Albertino's grandson Turcho was engaged to an unidentified daughter of Hungarian lord Henry Kőszegi on the occasion of a mutual agreement between Andrew III and the Hungarian barons in the summer of 1300.

== Sources ==
- Bácsatyai, Dániel (2018). "Aptatio stratarum. Egy balsikerű velencei követség és Magyarország 1286-ban [Aptatio stratarum. An Unsuccessful Venetian Legation and Hungary in 1286]". In Kádas, István; Skorka, Renáta; Weisz, Boglárka (eds.). Veretek, utak, katonák. Gazdaságtörténeti tanulmányok a magyar középkorról (in Hungarian). MTA Bölcsészettudományi Kutatóközpont. pp. 325–338. ISBN 978-963-416-124-0.
- Bácsatyai, Dániel (2023). "A széplelkű kamaraispán és más szerencselovagok. III. András olaszai [The Belletrist Chamber Ispán and other Adventurers. The Italians of Andrew III]". Századok (in Hungarian). 157 (6). Magyar Történelmi Társulat: 1171–1193. ISSN 0039-8098.
- Gerics, József (1987). A korai rendiség Európában és Magyarországon [The Early Society of Estates in Europe and Hungary] (in Hungarian). Akadémiai Kiadó. ISBN 963-05-4218-8.
- Jacoby, David (2016). "The Venetian Presence in the Crusader Lordship of Tyre: A Tale of Decline". In Boas, Adrian J. (ed.). The Crusader World. Venice: Routledge. pp. 181–195. ISBN 978-0-415-82494-1.
- Rudolf, Veronika (2023). Közép-Európa a hosszú 13. században [Central Europe in the Long 13th Century] (in Hungarian). Arpadiana XV., Research Centre for the Humanities. ISBN 978-963-416-406-7.
- Salvatori, Enrica (2012). "MOROSINI, Albertino". Dizionario Biografico degli Italiani (in Italian). Vol. 77: Morlini–Natolini. Rome: Istituto dell'Enciclopedia Italiana. ISBN 978-88-12-00032-6.
- Štefánik, Martin (2008). "The Morosinis in Hungary under King Andrew III and the two versions of the death of the Queen of Hungary Tommasina" (PDF). Historický Časopis. 56 (Supplement): 3–15. ISSN 0018-2575.
- Zsoldos, Attila (2003). "III. András". In Szovák, Kornél; Szentpéteri, József; Szakács, Margit (eds.). Szent István és III. András [Saint Stephen and Andrew III] (in Hungarian). Kossuth Kiadó. pp. 119–227. ISBN 963-09-4461-8.
