= Stephen the Posthumous =

Duke of Slavonia (1236–1271)

Stephen
- Duke of Slavonia; Podestà of Ravenna
- Born: 1236; Wehrda, Duchy of Thuringia
- Died: c. 10 April 1271 (aged 34–35); Venice, Republic of Venice
- Burial: San Michele in Isola
- Spouse: 1, Isabella Traversari; 2, Tomasina Morosini
- Issue: (1) Stephen (2) Andrew III of Hungary two illegitimate sons (Aimericus and Tralusius)
- Dynasty: Árpád dynasty
- Father: Andrew II of Hungary
- Mother: Beatrice d'Este

Stephen the Posthumous (Hungarian: Utószülött István, Croatian: Stjepan Posthumni, Slovak: Štefan Pohrobok, Italian: Stefano il Postumo; 1236–1271) was the posthumous son of King Andrew II of Hungary by his third wife, Beatrice d'Este. He was regarded as bastard son of infidelity by his much older half-brothers, including King Béla IV of Hungary, and was not allowed to receive ducal revenues from Hungary to which he would have been entitled as son of a Hungarian king.

He was first married to a widow, Isabella Traversari, by whom he had a short-lived son named Stephen. His second wife was Tomasina Morosini. Their son would later become King Andrew III of Hungary.

== Early years ==
[...] On the death of King Andrew [II], the lady [Beatrice d'Este] wished to return to her family, and to an assembly of the great men of the Hungarian kingdom and the archbishops and bishops she showed the manifest signs that she was great with child; and so she returned to her own land of Este, and there in her father's house [sic] she gave birth to a male child, whom at his baptism they named Stephen.

— Illuminated Chronicle

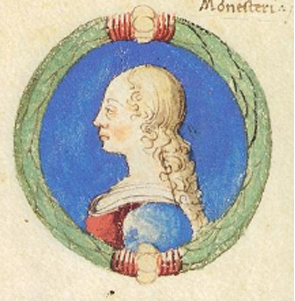
Queen Beatrice d'Este, Stephen's mother

The elderly Andrew II, who had been widowed recently for the second time, married the 23-year-old Beatrice d'Este in Székesfehérvár on 14 May 1234, even though his sons – Béla and Coloman – were sharply opposed to his third marriage. She was pregnant, when Andrew II died on 21 September 1235. The king's eldest son Béla IV ascended the Hungarian throne shortly thereafter. Béla and Coloman accused her of having, in King Andrew's life, an adulterous liaison with their father's influential lord Denis, son of Ampud. Béla IV dismissed and punished many of his father's closest advisors, including Denis, who was blinded and imprisoned; he died in captivity. Béla also ordered Beatrice's imprisonment, but she managed to escape to the Holy Roman Empire, where she gave birth to a posthumous son in the town of Wehrda, Duchy of Thuringia (present-day a borough of Marburg) in early 1236. Béla and Coloman considered her child to be a bastard, who was born out of the queen's extramarital affair with comes Denis. Later chronicles, for instance the Illuminated Chronicle, which sought to prove the lawful origin of Andrew III, were ignoring these details and emphasized that Beatrice wanted to return home voluntarily.

Stephen was named after Saint Stephen, the first King of Hungary, by which Queen Beatrice sought to emphasize the legitimate origin of her son. The exiled queen with her infant began her journey to Ferrara six months later. She was planning to live in the court of his uncle, but Marquis Azzo VII denied her request and refused to return her former estates. She spent the following years wandering in Italy, but did not receive significant financial support to promote her son's cause. Finally, Pope Innocent IV granted her revenues of 35 monasteries in Italy, in order to stabilize her financial condition. Beatrice sent her 7-year-old son Stephen to the court of Azzo VII at Ferrara in 1243, where he spent his childhood and received knightly education. He was also betrothed to Isabella, daughter of Pietro II Traversari. Beatrice never gave up her son's claims to receive ducal revenues from Hungary. She tried to persuade the Republic of Venice to support Stephen during the war with Hungary, but the Serenissima promised King Béla IV that it would not support Beatrice and her son in their peace of 30 June 1244, which ended the Dalmatian campaign. Beatrice died in the Gemola monastery in the first half of 1245.

== Adulthood ==
[...] He [Stephen] was nurtured and educated as son of the king of Hungary. But when he reached manhood, he wished to usurp by guile his grandfather’s title and estate; but the grandfather [sic, his great-uncle Azzo] was stronger, and banished him to remote parts. Stephen fled into Spain to the court of James, king of Aragon, who had married Stephen's aunt [Violant], the daughter of King Andrew of Hungary. After he had stayed there some time, he returned to Italy and was elected podestà by the citizens of Ravenna. Fleeing that town, he came to Venice. Here a certain Venetian [Michele Sbarra Morosini], one of the most powerful and wealthy citizens of the city, knowing of certain that he was the son of the king of Hungary, gave him his daughter [Tomasina] in marriage and made him partner in all his riches. By this wife Stephen had a son, whom he called Andrew after his father.

— Illuminated Chronicle

Stephen became orphan at the age of nine. Pope Innocent continued to his financial support, according to a papal letter from 25 February 1250 after the aforementioned 35 monasteries were reluctant to pass on their revenues to Stephen following Beatrice's death. According to a 16th-century chronicle, Stephen became acquainted with the political and social conditions of his place of origin, when Franciscan friars from Hungary visited Azzo's court. The 15th-century Humanist historian Antonio Bonfini claimed that Stephen's features alluded to royal descent and were particularly reminiscent of his father Andrew II. Meanwhile, the marquis had no legitimate male descendants after the death of his son, Rinaldo I d'Este in 1251. Thereafter, Stephen was considered a presumptive heir to the lordship of Ferrara as the closest male relative, but Azzo VII adopted his grandson Obizzo, the natural son of Rinaldo and declared him as his heir. Obizzo was legitimated by Pope Innocent IV in 1252.

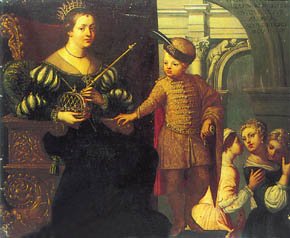
Stephen's second wife Tomasina Morosini with their son Andrew, future King of Hungary

Sometime around 1252, Stephen left Azzo's court and traveled to the Kingdom of Aragon, where his half-sister Violant was the queen consort, but died in the autumn of 1251. Nevertheless, Stephen enjoyed the hospitality of his brother-in-law King James I of Aragon and his family. There, Stephen was also recognized as a legitimate member of the Árpád dynasty. Sometime later in the first half of the 1250s, Stephen returned to Italy and departed for his great-uncle's rival Pietro II Traversari, who served as Podestà of Ravenna – while Azzo was considered the leader of the Guelph forces in the March of Ancona, the Traversaris (as Ghibellines) supported the efforts of the Holy Roman Emperors in Romagna. Stephen resided the upcoming decade there; according to Ludovico Antonio Muratori, Stephen married Pietro's daughter Isabella in 1262 (they had been engaged before), the widow of local patrician Tomaso de Foliano. Stephen was also admitted to the Traversari family and was authorized to bear their surname. A son, Stephen, was born from the marriage, but soon both Isabella and the infant had died sometime around 1263.

Shortly thereafter, Stephen left Ravenna for the Republic of Venice, where he represented the Traversaris' political and business interests. There, Stephen married Tomasina Morosini around 1264, a daughter of a wealthy Venetian patrician Michele Sbarra Morosini. With this marriage, Stephen acquired large wealth and political influence, the Morosini family were one of the most prominent political dynasties in Venice. The marriage produced a son, Andrew, who was born around 1265. According to the Illuminated Chronicle, Stephen was elected podestà by the citizens of Ravenna, during the internal war between the Traversari and the da Polenta families (the latter ultimately expelled their enemies from the city in 1275 during a revolt). Stephen cooperated with the influential archbishop Filippo da Pistoia. After the death of Azzo VII, Guelph leaders elected Obizzo II as the next lord (signore) of Ferrara in February 1264, Stephen lost his last faint chance of inheritance. Stephen unsuccessfully tried to look for allies against Obizzo, for instance Charles I of Anjou around 1267.

Béla IV died in May 1270. His son Stephen V (Stephen the Posthumous' nephew) succeeded him as king of Hungary. When Ottokar II of Bohemia invaded Hungary in the spring of 1271, the Bohemian monarch contacted Stephen and intended him to use his person as a claimant to the Hungarian throne against Stephen V. However, the Hungarians won a decisive victory in May 1271. The two kings' envoys reached an agreement in Pressburg on 2 July. In the document, Ottokar II, among others, promised to renounce the support of Stephen the Posthumous as claimant to the Hungarian throne.

== Death ==
Stephen the Posthumous, who was ailing, compiled his last will and testament on 10 April 1271. Stephen resided the Morosinis' San Giuliano Palace in Venice. He was styled himself as "Duke of Slavonia" and "the son of the late King Andrew" in the document, but his claim to the crown of Hungary was not mentioned in the testament. He declared his minor son Andrew as his heir to his claims in Hungary and Italy (Slavonia and Este, respectively), and nominated his wife's two kinsmen, her brother Albertino Morosini and brother-in-law Marino Gradenigo, as Andrew's guardians. Stephen also mentioned his two natural sons without specifying their name and age, whom he financially and hypothetically took care of from the incomes of Slavonia and Este, after his heir Andrew takes possession of these two estates.

Stephen died shortly after making his will, plausibly already before the conclusion of the treaty of Pressburg. He was buried in the namesake church of the San Michele Island in Venice within the tomb of the Morosini family.

== Legacy ==
After failed attempts in 1278 and 1287, his son Andrew successfully acquired the Hungarian throne in 1290, becoming the last monarch of the Árpád dynasty.

Historian Dániel Bácsatyai identified a certain Aimery or Emeric (Aimericus) as one of the illegitimate sons of Stephen, who began his journey from the court of James II of Aragon to Hungary in August 1291 in order to receive a share of the property of the acquired Slavonia in accordance with his father's above-mentioned last testament. Consequently, this Aimery was born in the early 1250s to Stephen and his unidentified concubine.

Stephen's second natural son comes Tralusius (or Tralusio) also arrived to Hungary. He was made castellan of Visegrád sometime after 1294. According to a complaint from 1301, "former" castellan Tralusius arbitrarily and unlawfully relocated the population of Kékes to Szentendre, causing a damage to the Diocese of Veszprém. It is possible that Tralusius also bore the title of ispán of Pilis County simultaneously.

== Sources ==
=== Primary sources ===
- Bak, János M.; Veszprémy, László; Kersken, Norbert (2018). Chronica de gestis Hungarorum e codice picto saec. XIV [The Illuminated Chronicle: Chronicle of the deeds of the Hungarians from the fourteenth-century illuminated codex]. Budapest: Central European University Press. ISBN 978-9-6338-6264-3.

=== Secondary studies ===
- Bácsatyai, Dániel (2023). "A széplelkű kamaraispán és más szerencselovagok. III. András olaszai [The Belletrist Chamber Ispán and other Adventurers. The Italians of Andrew III]". Századok (in Hungarian). 157 (6). Magyar Történelmi Társulat: 1171–1193. ISSN 0039-8098.
- Kristó, Gyula; Makk, Ferenc (1996). Az Árpád-ház uralkodói [Rulers of the House of Árpád] (in Hungarian). I.P.C. Könyvek. ISBN 963-7930-97-3.
- Nyáry, Albert (1869). "Posthumus István, az utolsó Árpád-király atyja [Stephen the Posthumous, the Father of the Last Árpádian King]". Századok (in Hungarian). 3 (6). Magyar Történelmi Társulat: 378–396. ISSN 0039-8098.
- Teke, Zsuzsa (1994). "István 6. (utószülött)". In Kristó, Gyula; Engel, Pál; Makk, Ferenc (eds.). Korai magyar történeti lexikon (9–14. század) [Encyclopedia of the Early Hungarian History (9th–14th centuries)] (in Hungarian). Akadémiai Kiadó. p. 294. ISBN 963-05-6722-9.
- Wertner, Mór (1892). Az Árpádok családi története [Family History of the Árpáds] (in Hungarian). Szabó Ferencz N.-eleméri plébános & Pleitz Fer. Pál Könyvnyomdája.
- Zsoldos, Attila (2003). "III. András". In Szovák, Kornél; Szentpéteri, József; Szakács, Margit (eds.). Szent István és III. András [Saint Stephen and Andrew III] (in Hungarian). Kossuth Kiadó. pp. 119–227. ISBN 963-09-4461-8.
