= Casimir Freschot =

French historian, chronicler and translator

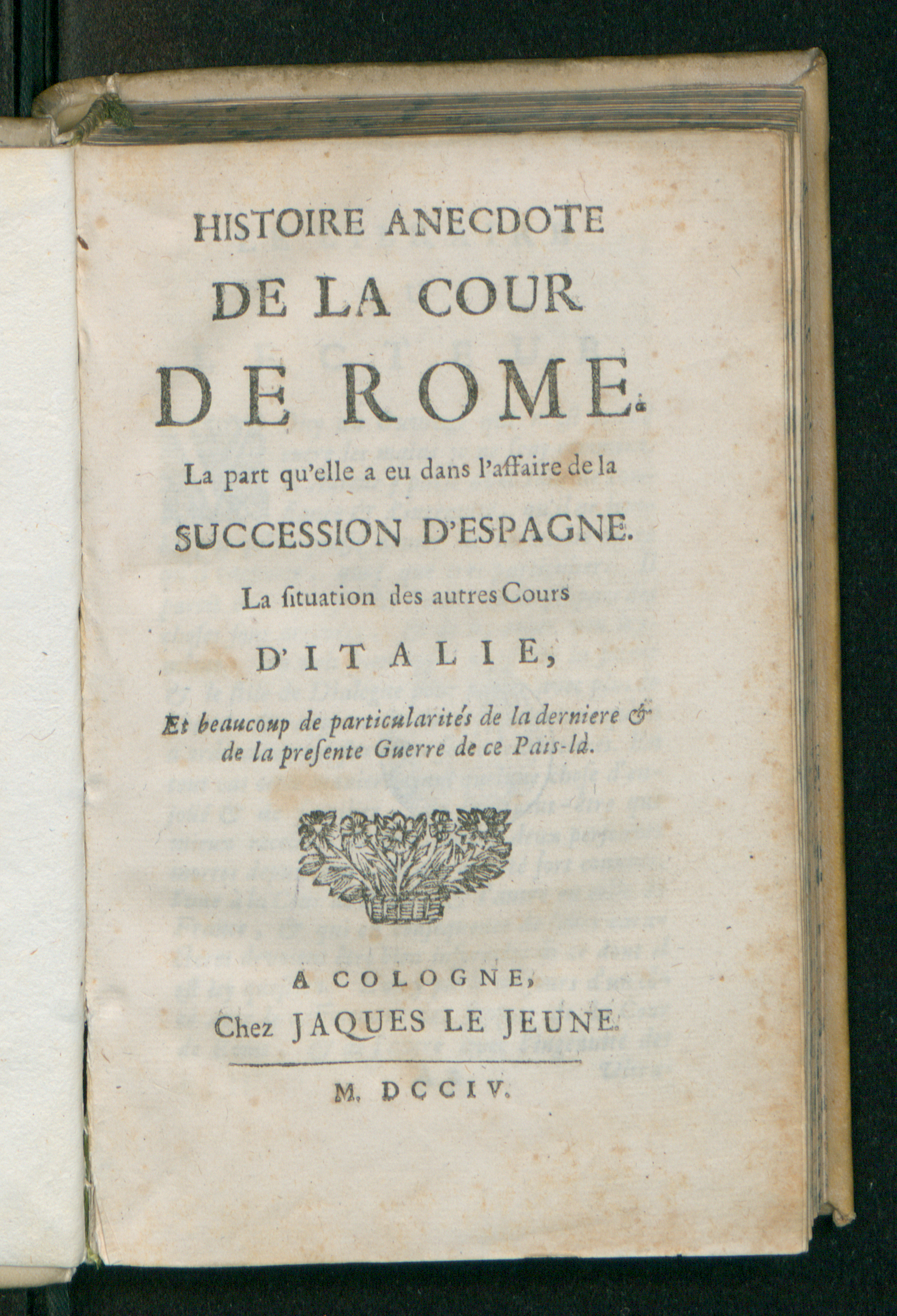
Histoire anecdote de la Cour de Rome, 1704

Casimir Freschot (1640? – October 20, 1720) was a French historian, chronicler and translator. He was the author of about fifty works, both in French, Italian and Latin on various historical and contemporary subjects, the most notable being Li pregi della Nobiltà Veneta abbozzati in un giuoco d'arme, published in Venice in 1682, Origine, progressi e ruina del calvinismo nella Francia, ragguaglio istorico di D. Casimiro Freschot, published in 1693, and Histoire du congrès et de la paix d'Utrecht - par C. Freschot, published in 1716.

== Biography ==
Born in Morteau around 1640, he became a novice in the benedictine Saint-Maur congregation, and was ordained on March 20, 1663, in the Saint-Vincent de Besançon monastery.

In 1674 he moved to Italy, first in Rome, then in Bologna, finally joining the benedictine congregation in Montecassino. Around 1700 he returned to the lay state and moved to the Netherlands, in Utrecht, where he earned a living teaching literature and history. During his stay in the Netherlands, he published (1706-1707) the monthly Entretiens sur les affaires du temps. Having returned to France, Freschot was reintegrated as a monk in the Saint-Vanne congregation in 1718. He died in 1720, in the Abbey of Luxeuil.
