= Pilisszentlászló =

- Coat of arms

- Location of Pilisszentlászló in Hungary
- Coordinates: 47.72306°N 18.98869°E
- Country: Hungary
- Region: Central Hungary
- County: Pest
- Subregion: Szentendrei
- Rank: Village

Area
  - Total: 17.75 km^{2} (6.85 sq mi)

Population (1 January 2008)
  - Total: 1,091
  - Density: 61.46/km^{2} (159.2/sq mi)
- Time zone: UTC+1 (CET)
  - Summer (DST): UTC+2 (CEST)
- Postal code: 2009
- Area code: +36 26
- KSH code: 08457
- Website: www.pilisszentlaszlo.hu

Pilisszentlászló is a village in Pest county, Hungary.

It has fewer than 900 inhabitants.
