= Morosini family =

Venetian patrician family

- Country: Republic of Venice
- Titles: Patrician (Patrizio veneto)

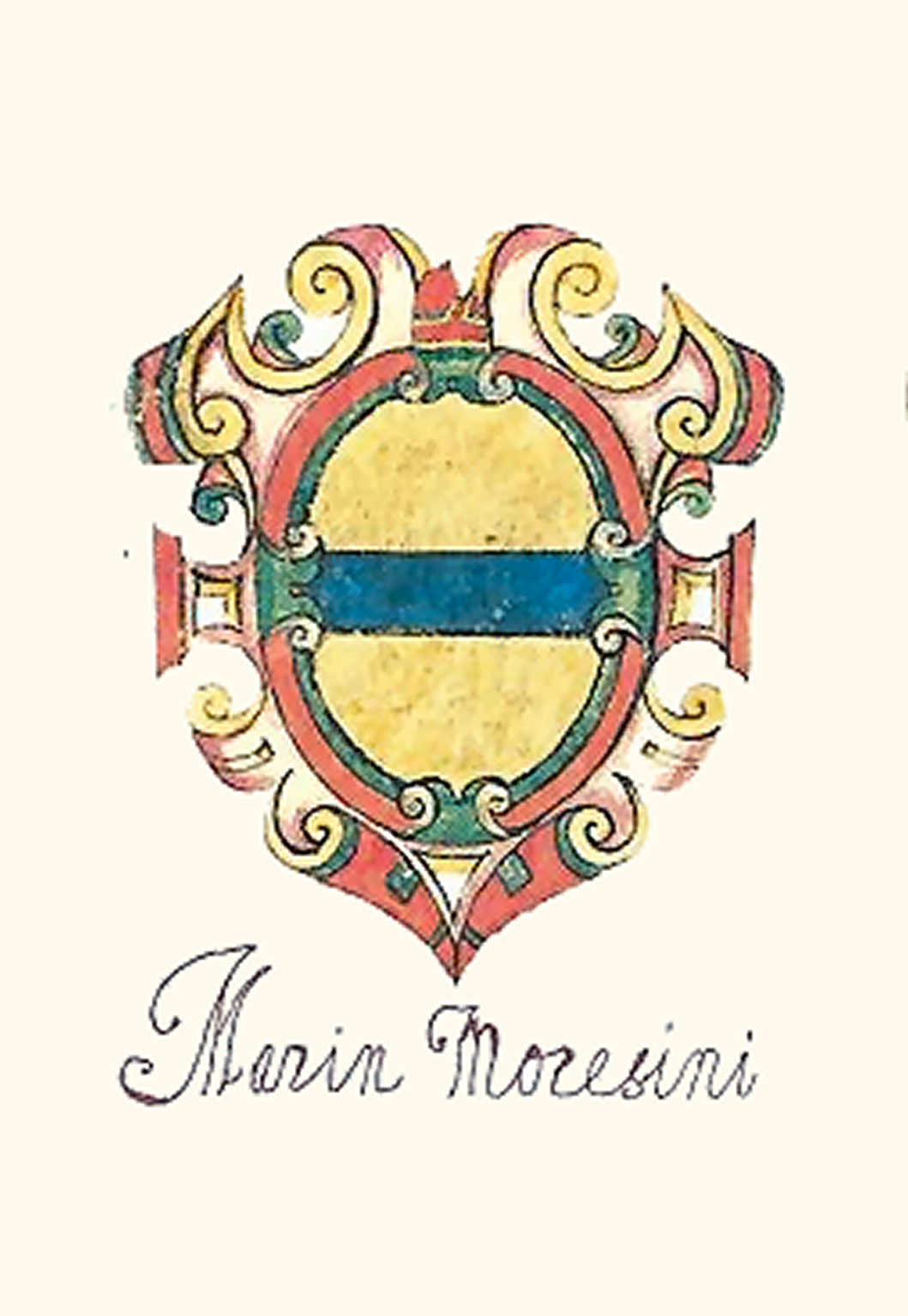
Coat of arms of Marino Morosini (1181–1253)

The House of Morosini was a powerful Venetian patrician family that gave many statesmen, generals, and admirals to the Republic of Venice. The family produced four doges and twenty-six procurators of Saint Mark, as well as two cardinals and numerous prelates to the Catholic Church.

== History ==
One legend says the family reached the Venetian lagoon in order to escape the invasion of Attila in northern Italy, and another source places the family’s origin namely in the city of Mantua. It first became prominent at the time of doges Tribuno Memmo and Pietro II Orseolo, owing to its rivalry with the Caloprini family, which it subjugated by the end of the 10th century. In the first half of the 12th century, Doge Domenico Morosini and his sons, Giovanni and Domenico, were primary architects of Venice's expansion into the Adriatic Sea and the establishment of its maritime jurisdiction over the Gulf of Venice; they campaigned against Pola, Parenzo, Ancona, the cities of Istria, the Normans, and fought in the Holy Land.

The Morosini family actively participated in the Fourth Crusade, with crusaders such as Domenico and Sebastiano as well as Tommaso Morosini, a Camaldolese monk who became the first Latin Patriarch of Constantinople. In the 13th century, Giacomo, Ruggero, Marco, and Doge Marino Morosini contributed to the exapansion of Venetian influence across the Mediterranean. Michele Morosini served as podestà of Faenza, enduring a six-month siege by Emperor Frederick II in 1241, and in the final quarter of the century, Albertino and his son Michele, a general in the war against Padua, provided notable military service to the Republic.

The family also exerted international influence through strategic marriages. Tomasina Morosini married King Stephen of Hungary, securing a path to the royal crown for her descendants, while Constanza Morosini married King Stefan Vladislav II of Serbia, entering the Serbian royal lineage. These regional alliances elevated the family's standing. Albertino Morosini, Tomasina’s brother and Costanza’s grandfather, was a highly active figure in late 13th-century domestic and foreign politics. Thanks to his sister's marriage in 1291, he received the titles of Prince of Morlachia, Duke of Slavonia, Count of Bosnia, and Ban of Croatia. He went on to heavily influence Hungarian politics as an advisor to his nephew, King Andrew III, during the conflict over the Hungarian crown.

During the 15th century, the family's public profile became less prominent as they focused on routine administrative, political, and military duties, while other Venetian families rose to prominence. However, the influence of the Morosini re-emerged in the late 16th and early 17th centuries across various fields. Giovan Francesco Morosini distinguished himself as a diplomat and cardinal, while Francesco Morosini served in multiple offices, including podestà of Feltre and Treviso, provveditore of Palma and Monfalcone, head of the Council of Ten and Procurator of Saint Mark. The late 17th century saw the rise of another Francesco Morosini, the family's most famous member, who became the only doge of Venice after Enrico Dandolo to lead a major maritime expedition while in office. The scale of his exploits in the Morean War ultimately overshadowed the achievements of other relatives who participated in the campaign, such as Daniele, Giuseppe, Taddeo, Angelo, and Lorenzo, as well as subsequent generations.

== Notable members ==
- Blessed Giovanni Morosini ( –1012†), founder in 982 and first abbot of the Benedictine Monastery San Giorgio Maggiore on the island of the same name in Venice, Italy.
- Domenico Morosini (died 1156), elected doge of Venice in 1148, waged war with success against the Dalmatian corsairs, recapturing Pola and other Istrian towns from them.
- Albertino Morosini (c. 1230–1305), Venetian statesman and Podestà of the Republic of Pisa, brother of Tomasina Morosini.
- Tomasina Morosini (c. 1250–1300), mother of King Andrew III of Hungary. Her brother's granddaughter, Constanza, was married to King Stefan Vladislav II of Syrmia.
- Marino Morosini (1181–1252) was elected doge in 1249.

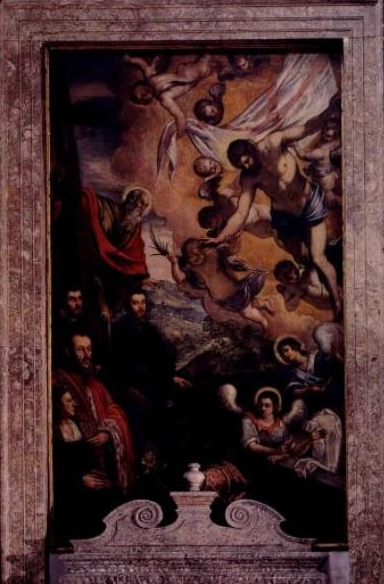
Risen Christ with St. Andrew and members of the Morosini family (Vincenzo, his sons Andrea and Barbon, and wife Cecilia Pisani) by Tintoretto (1518–1594), on display in the Morosini family chapel in San Giorgio Maggiore, Venice.

- Michele Morosini (1308–1382) was doge from June 1382 until his death in October of the same year.
- Antonio Morosini (c.1360–1433) wrote a very long chronicle ('The Morosini Codex') which recorded events in Venice and elsewhere during the first third of the 15th century.
- Aliodea Morosini (d. 1478), was dogaressa of Venice.
- Giovan Francesco Morosini (1537–1596) was a cardinal, Bishop of Brescia and Apostolic Nuncio in France. Son of Pietro Morosini and Cornelia Cornaro, nephew of Cardinal Luigi Cornaro and Cardinal Federico Cornaro.

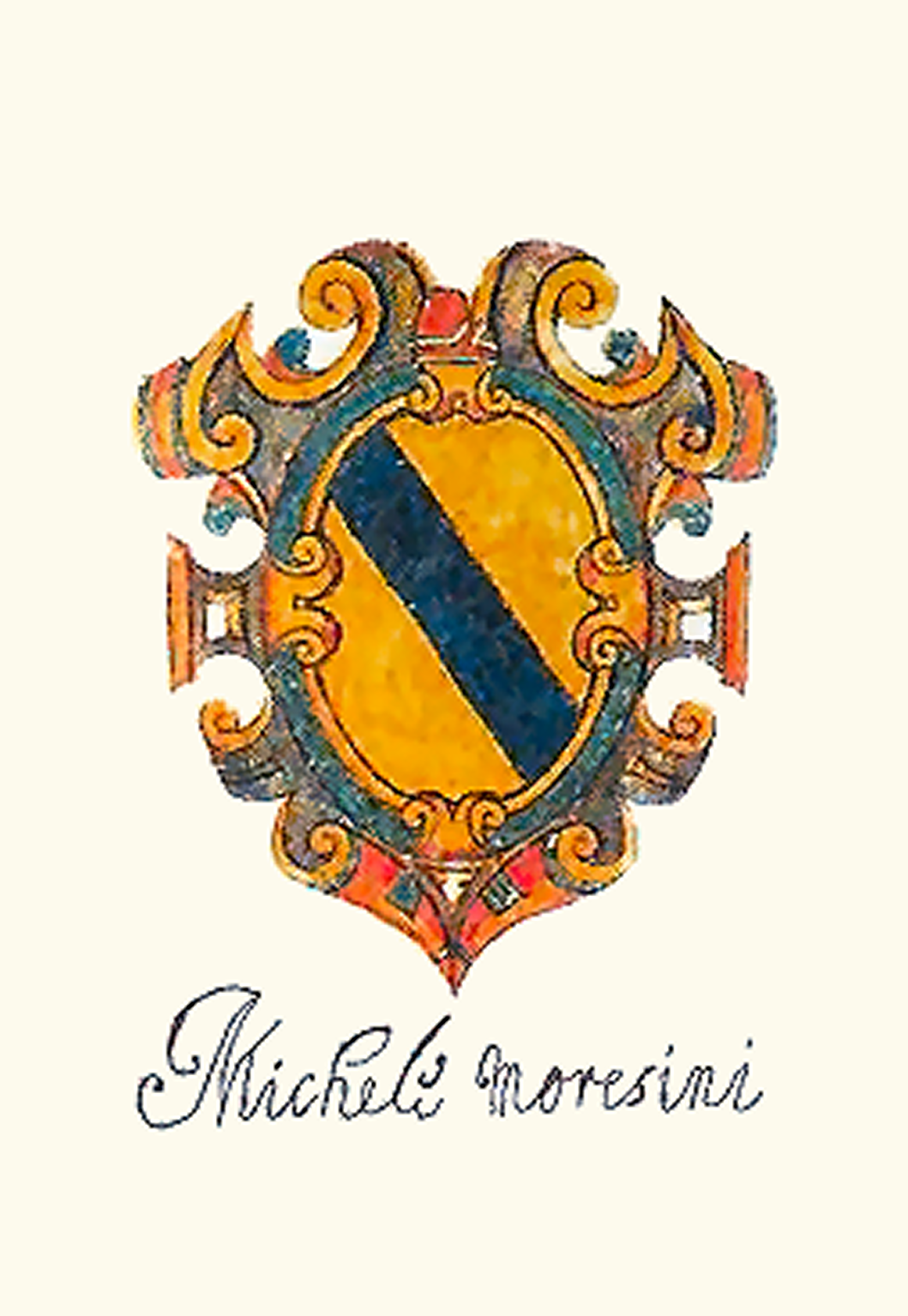
Coat of arms of Michele Morosini (1308–1382)

- Morosina Morosini-Grimani (1545–1614), dogaressa of Venice by marriage to Doge Marino Grimani
- Andrea Morosini (1558–1618) was a famous historian and was entrusted by the Venetian senate with the task of continuing Paolo Paruta's Annali Veneti, in Latin. His history of Venice was published by his brother in 1623, and translated into Italian by Senator Girolamo Melin (Venice, 1782). Among his other works are: Le Imprese ed espeditioni di terra santa, &c. (Venice, 1627); Deus quae Veneta respublica ad Istriae oras gessit, &c. (in the Corner-Duodo collection of MSS.); De forma reipublicae Venetae in MS. in the Bibliothèque Nationale in Paris. His life has been written by Luigi Lollin (1623), by Niccolo Crasso (1621), and by Antonio Palazzoli (1620).

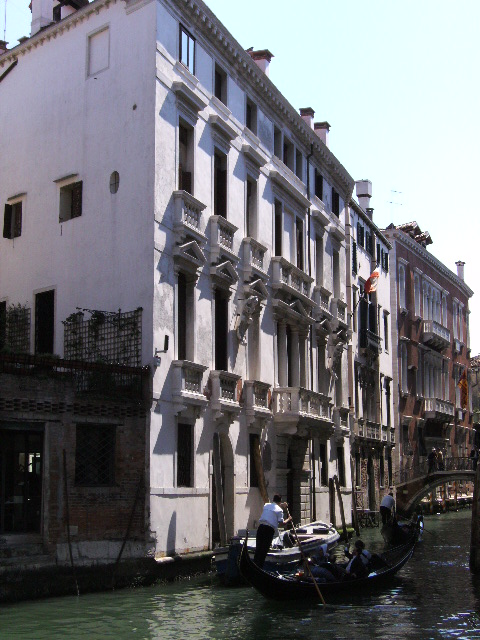
The Palazzo Morosini del Pestrin on the Rio Dei Pestrin in Venice, built for the Morosini family ca. 1640. Picture taken from the end of calle delle Cavatto.

- Giovan Francesco Morosini (1604–1678) was Patriarch of Venice from 1644 to his death.
- Francesco Morosini (1618–1694) was a prominent Venetian sea captain of his time. As a young man, he fought against the Ottoman Turks and the pirates, and after signally distinguishing himself at the Battle of Naxos in 1650, he was appointed commander-in-chief of the Venetian navy. He then conducted a series of successful campaigns against the Turks, but was recalled in consequence of the intrigues of his rival the provveditore Antonio Barbaro (1661). But when Candia was attacked by a large force under the fierce Grand Vizier Köprülü, Morosini was sent to relieve the fortress in 1667; the siege lasted eighteen months, but Morosini, in spite of his prodigies of valor, was forced to surrender to save the surviving inhabitants. He was tried, but acquitted of all blame, and on the renewal of the war with the Turkish Empire in 1684, he was again appointed commander-in-chief, and after several brilliant victories, he reconquered the Peloponnese and Athens. During the siege of Athens, shells from Morosini's bombardment irreparably damaged the Parthenon. Upon his return to Venice, he was loaded with honors and given the title of Peloponnesiaco. In 1688, he was elected doge, and in 1693 he took command of the Venetian forces against the Turks for the fourth time; the enemy which had been cruising in the Aegean archipelago withdrew at his approach, so great was the terror inspired by his name. While wintering at Napoli di Romania (Nauplia), he died on 6 January 1694.

== See also ==
- Morosini Fountain, Heraklion
- Oratorio di Sant'Angelo degli Zoppi
