= San Marco =

One of the six sestieri of Venice

Coordinates: 45.434°N 12.333°E

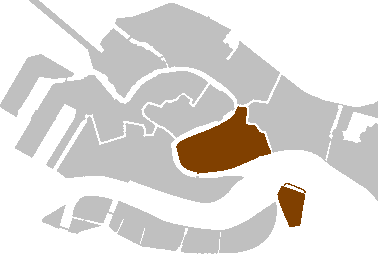
San Marco shown within Venice

San Marco is one of the six sestieri of Venice, lying in the heart of the city as the main place of Venice. San Marco also includes the island of San Giorgio Maggiore. Although the district includes Saint Mark's Square, that was never administered as part of the sestiere.

== Overview ==
The small district includes many of Venice's most famous sights, including St Mark's Square, Saint Mark's Basilica, the Doge's Palace, Harry's Bar, the Palazzo Dandolo, Palazzo Corner Contarini dei Cavalli, Palazzo Venier Contarini, Palazzo Corner Valmarana, Palazzo D'Anna Viaro Martinengo Volpi di Misurata, Palazzo Cavalli, San Moisè, the La Fenice theatre, the Palazzo Grassi and Palazzo Bellavite, and the churches of San Beneto, San Fantin, Santa Maria del Giglio, San Maurizio, San Moisè, Santo Stefano, San Salvador, San Zulian and San Samuele.

The area is densely built and was the location of Venice's government. It is now heavily touristed and there are many hotels, banks and expensive shops.

San Marco is also a place which is used in several video games such as in Tekken, Assassin's Creed II, and Venetica.

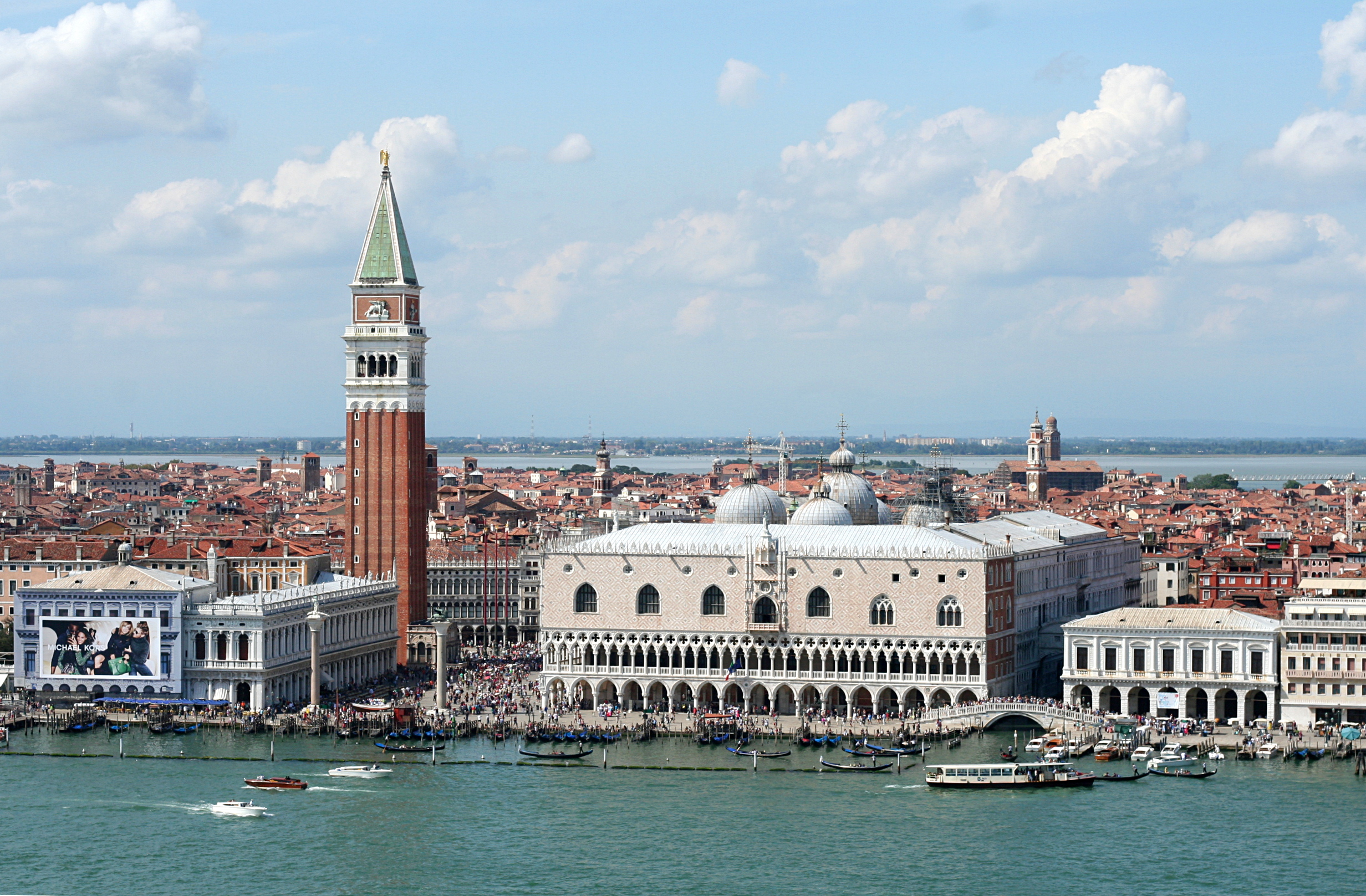
San Marco seen from the bell tower of San Giorgio Maggiore

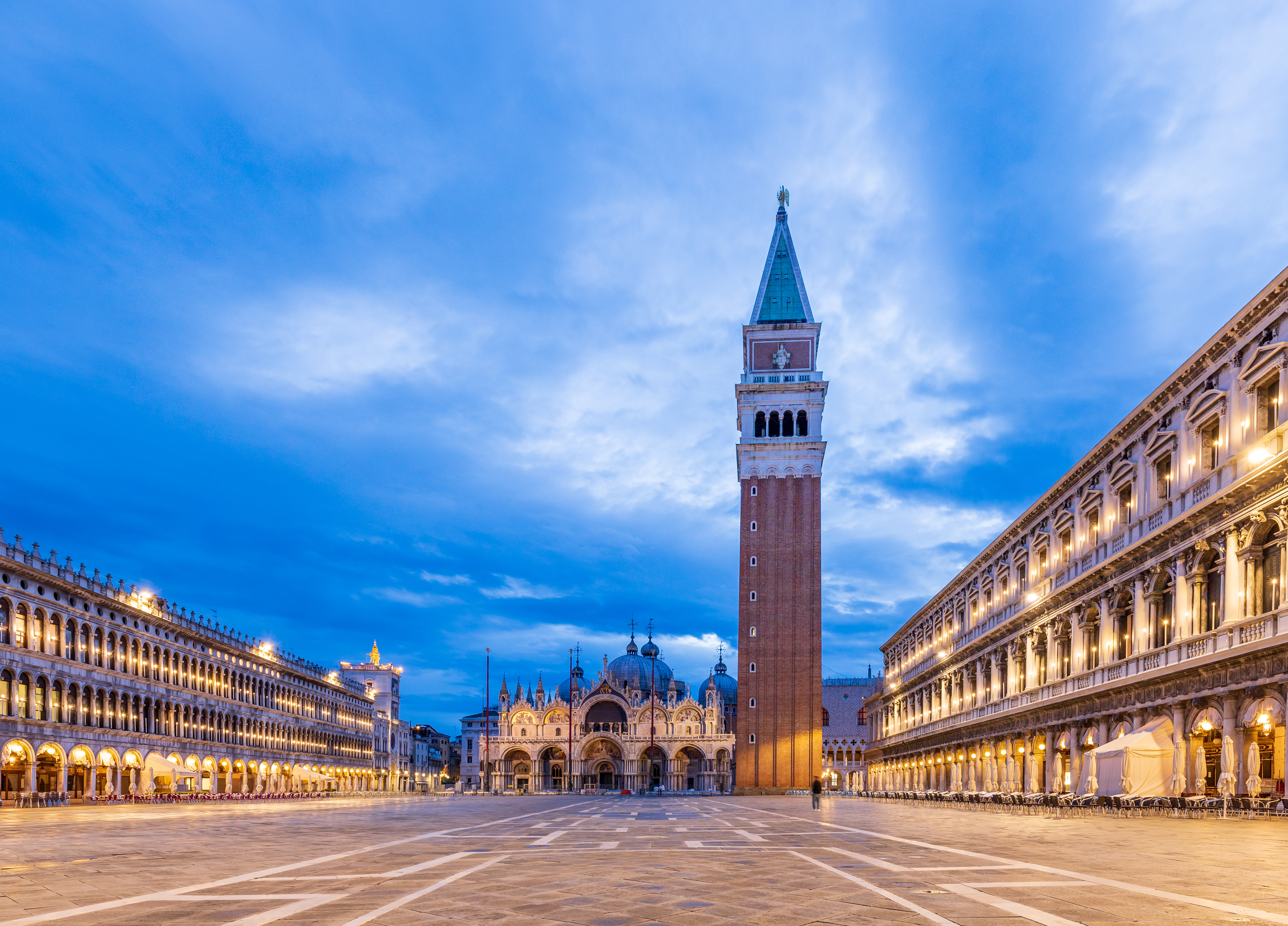
St Mark's Square

== See also ==
- Oratorio di Sant'Angelo degli Zoppi
- Sestieri of Venice
