= Elizabeth of Hungary, Queen of Serbia =

Elizabeth of Hungary
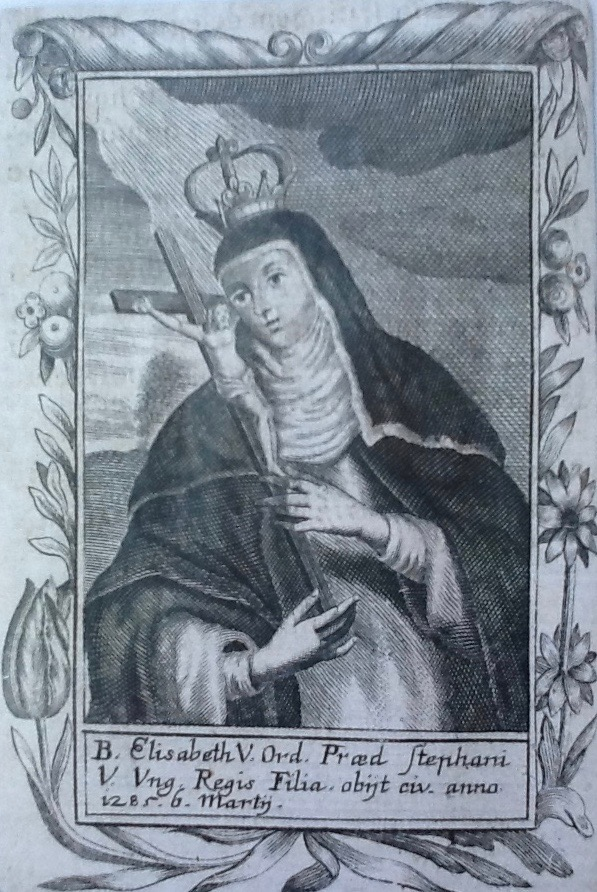
- Lithograph from the Régi Magyar Szentség (Ungaricae Sanctitatis Indicia), 1695.

Queen consort of Serbia
- Tenure: 1283–1284
- Born: c. 1255
- Died: c. 1322 (aged 66-67)
- Spouse: Záviš of Falkenstein; Stefan Uroš II Milutin of Serbia
- Issue Detail: Zorica; Ana-Neda; Stefan Konstantin
- Dynasty: Árpád
- Father: Stephen V of Hungary
- Mother: Elizabeth the Cuman

Elizabeth of Hungary (Hungarian: Erzsébet, Serbian: Јелисавета/Jelisaveta; c. 1255 – c. 1322), also known as Blessed Elizabeth the Widow (Hungarian: Árpádházi Boldog Erzsébet), was a Hungarian princess member of the Árpád dynasty and (briefly and disputed) Queen consort of Serbia. Since childhood, she was veiled as a nun, but she was married twice, and both times she was kidnapped by her husbands, Bohemian magnate Záviš of Falkenstein and King Stefan Uroš II Milutin of Serbia. Both husbands were in an unacceptable degree of kinship with Elizabeth from a canonical point of view: the marriage with Záviš of Falkenstein was not recognized by the Hungarian Church, and the marriage with Stefan Uroš II Milutin was not recognized by the Serbian Church. Nevertheless, Elizabeth was venerated by the Hungarian Church as Blessed, while her scandalous marriage history is almost never mentioned in the later accounts of her life.

== Life ==
=== Origins and early years ===
Elizabeth was the daughter of King Stephen V of Hungary and his Cuman wife, baptized as Elizabeth and probably in turn a daughter of Köten, a Cuman–Kipchak chieftain (khan) and military commander active in the mid-13th century. She had five known siblings: Catherine (wife of King Stefan Dragutin of Serbia), Mary (wife of King Charles II of Naples), Anna (wife of Byzantine Emperor Andronikos II Palaiologos), King Ladislaus IV of Hungary and Andrew, Duke of Slavonia. Her exact date of birth is unknown; however, according to a letter of Archbishop Lodomer of Esztergom to Pope Nicholas IV dated 8 May 1288 and recorded in 1308 in the Anonymi Descriptio Europae Orientalis, by 1288 Elizabeth was around 32–34 years old, 26 years of which she lived in a monastery. Thus, her birth date could be placed around 1254–1256, making her the eldest child of her family, assumption confirmed by historian Ferenc Kanyó, who based this fact on the Legend of Saint Margaret and Elizabeth's own confession of her aunt's veneration (1276), where is mentioned that she was the firstborn daughter of King Stephen V; however, according to historian Gyula Kristó, whose opinion is based on Mór Wertner's work, Elizabeth was born about 1260, being the third (or fourth) (Note: According to Kristó, King Stephen V had another daughter (name unknown) who was the wife of Despot Jacob Svetoslav.) daughter of her family.

Elizabeth was four years old when she was sent to the Dominican Monastery of the Blessed Virgin on Rabbits' Island (now Margaret Island), a community founded by her grandfather, King Béla IV of Hungary for his daughter, Margaret, whom he consecrated to God on a vow. In 1259, the later King Stephen V confirmed the privileges of the monastery founded by his father with a letter and mentioned Elizabeth. It was probably then that the princess settled in the monastery. Stephen probably followed his father, Béla IV's example, who had sent his firstborn daughter, Margaret, Stephens oldest sister, to the Rabbits' Island.

Little is known about the years of Elizabeth's monastic life. A 1265 document and the life history of her aunt Saint Margaret, briefly mention her as living in the Monastery of the Blessed Virgin. Saint Margaret died in 1270 and, according to documents, she wished that her niece would become the next Abbess of her community. Elizabeth is mentioned first time as head nun (priorissa) of the monastery in 1278. The prosperity of the Monastery of the Blessed Virgin during the years of Elizabeth's life is recorded in numerous documents of this time. By order of King Ladislaus IV, from 1287 the monastery had the right to receive taxes from the Buda fair. Numerous estates and a large number of subsequent donations from the royal family made the monastery one of the richest ecclesiastical institutions in Hungary at the end of the 13th century. According to the late texts of Legend of Saint Margaret she suggested to use her aunts' relics when King Ladislaus IV fell in a serious ill.

Elizabeth had two marriages in her life, but the historical sources are controversial.

=== Marriage with Záviš of Falkenstein ===
Záviš of Falkenstein was the lover and then second husband of Kunigunda of Halych, widow of King Ottokar II of Bohemia. In September 1285, Kunigunda died, but Záviš retained influence over her son, King Wenceslaus II of Bohemia.

It's known that Elizabeth had a great influence on her brother, King Ladislaus IV. This is evidenced by the fact that, at her request, Ladislaus IV's wife, Elizabeth of Sicily was imprisoned in a monastery from September 1286 to August 1287. Archbishop Lodomer wrote that the "seed of discord between the King and his wife had been planted" by the King's sister. Around 1287–1288 Záviš of Falkenstein arrived in Hungary, possibly to negotiate an alliance. Perhaps it was Elizabeth's influence over her brother that prompted Zavis to marry her. Elizabeth was kidnapped from the Monastery of the Blessed Virgin and became the wife of Zavis on 4 May 1288. The kidnapping was carried out by Ladislaus IV's courtiers. On this occasion, the Hungarian King allegedly said: "If I had 15 or more sisters in as many cloistered communities as you like, I would snatch them from there to marry them off licitly or illicitly; in order to procure through them a kin-group who will support me by all their power in the fulfillment of my will". Archbishop Lodomer indignantly informed Pope Nicholas IV about the abduction of Elizabeth and her marriage with Zavis in the letter dated 8 May 1288. The Archbishop expressed certainty that Elizabeth was kidnapped of her own free will. In addition, he accused both Zavis and Elizabeth of incest, claiming that they were related in the "second degree of kinship" (both of Zavis' wives were granddaughters of Bela IV, King of Hungary; the canonic law of that time prohibited marriage between such kinds of close relatives).

Elizabeth asked Archbishop Lodomer to recognize her marriage, but he refused. After that, Zavis and Elizabeth took refuge in the Kingdom of Bohemia in the Falkenstein states, where Elizabeth gave birth to a son in late 1288. During the absence of Zavis from Bohemia, his enemies turned King Wenceslaus II against his stepfather, who appropriated the inheritance of late Dowager Queen Kunigunda. After the birth of his son, Zavis decided to invite King Wenceslaus II to the baptism, but the sovereign insisted that Zavis must arrive to Prague to present the invitation in person. When Zavis arrived at court in January 1289, he was arrested, and he was demanded, in an ultimatum, to return the castles and lands of Dowager Queen Kunigunda to the royal treasury. Zavis refused to comply with the King's demands, after which he was accused of high treason and executed. Záviš of Falkenstein was beheaded on 24 August 1290 in front of his brothers at the Hluboká Castle walls.

It is not known what Elizabeth did after the execution of her husband, although it is probable that she returned to the Monastery of the Blessed Virgin in Rabbits' Island.

The fate of her son by Záviš's is unknown, but it is presumed he was taken by his mother to her homeland, following his father's execution.

=== Marriage with Stefan Uroš II Milutin of Serbia ===
The sources from Hungary don't know anything about her other marriage with Milutin, nor the chronicles, nor the charters. On the instructions of her brother, Elizabeth went to Serbia, where their sister Catherine lived as the wife of King Stefan Dragutin. It was there were Dragutin's brother Stefan Uroš Milutin saw her; according to the message of chronicler George Pachymeres, Elizabeth was "captured" by Milutin against her will. The chronicler didn't include Elizabeth among Milutin's legitimate wives and called this relationship "shameful and adulterous". This marriage also created problems from the very beginning:

- first, Elizabeth broke her monastic vows once again;
- secondly, she belonged to the Roman Catholic Church, while her husband belonged to the Serbian Orthodox Church;
- thirdly, the elder brother of Milutin, Stefan Dragutin, was married to Catherine of Hungary, Elizabeth's sister. From the point of view of the Orthodox Church, two brothers could not be married to two sisters – such a relationship was considered unacceptable, although by the rules of the Roman Catholic Church had (under Pope Innocent III) specifically decreed that affinity does not produce further affinity and thus, marriages of siblings were immaterial to canonical obstacles;
- fourthly, Milutin's first wife was still alive.

Milutin's mother, Queen Helen of Anjou, turned to the Pope with a request to declare the marriage invalid, and Elizabeth was sent back to the Monastery of the Blessed Virgin in Rabbits' Island. The Directorium ad passagium faciendum (1332) and the Anonymi Descriptio Europae Orientalis (1308) mention Elizabeth's refusal to the planned marriage of Milutin and Simonis Palaiologina.

==== Dating of marriage with Milutin ====
There are two points of view on the date of Elizabeth's marriage to Stefan Uroš II Milutin. According to the first one, this union took place before the marriage with Záviš of Falkenstein (that is, before 1287), according to the second one, it took place after the execution of Zavis (that is, after 1290). At the same time, if there are no ambiguities about the dates of the beginning and end of the marriage with Zavis (1287–1290), then the same cannot be said about the marriage with Milutin. The confused personal life of Milutin has led to the fact that the sequence and dating of his marriages and the names of the mothers of his children are still the subject of debate. The chronology of these marriages varies according to the sources, but, in addition to Elizabeth, the following women are almost unanimously named as wives of Milutin: an unknown Serbian noblewoman (possibly named Jelena), a daughter (Note: The name of Milutin's Thessalian wife is not indicated in any of the primary sources who survives today, as well as the name of Milutin's Serbian first wife. It was assumed earlier that Helena/Jelena was the name of the Thessalian wife, because, in the monastery of Đurđevi stupovi, on a fresco dating from 1282-1283, next to Milutin, is depicted "Helena the Queen of the Serbs". This fresco for a number of reasons (title, insignia and attire of Milutin, a joint image of two brothers sitting at a meeting) dates from 1282-1283, immediately after the construction of the Cathedral in Deževa. At the same time, Milutin's wife, Queen Helena, appears on a Serbian icon in the Basilica di San Nicola in Bari: to the right of St. Nicholas is Milutin, and to his left is Queen Helena, his wife, and the other Helena, Milutin's mother. Since John I Doukas of Thessaly had another daughter named Helena (who married William I de la Roche, Duke of Athens), this other daughter, who became Milutin's wife, could not be called Helena.) of John I Doukas of Thessaly, the Bulgarian princess Ana Terter and the Byzantine princess Simonis Palaiologina.

- According to the first version, coming from chronicler George Pachymeres, Elizabeth was not a legitimate wife, but Milutin's concubine (before Ana Terter).
- According to the second version, coming from historian Nicephorus Gregoras, Elizabeth was Milutin's second wife, after the daughter of John I Doukas and before Ana Terter:
  After being married for several years with his first wife, who was the daughter of the ruler of Thessaly, he sent her home and married his brother's sister-in-law after he forced her to leave the monastery. Then, since the Church had long opposed such a relationship, he sent her away as well. And he married the sister of Svyatoslav, the ruler of Bulgaria. He did not have children from any of the three.
  — Nicephorus Gregoras.
- According to the third version, Elizabeth was Milutin's third wife.
- The Directorium ad passagium faciendum (1332) records that Milutin had only two legal wives: Elizabeth and Simonis Palaiologina.

===== Before 1287 =====
In 1284 Milutin married Ana Terter. Therefore, if Elizabeth's marriage to Milutin is considered the first, it should be dated not "before 1287", but "before 1284". This is a traditional dating, and until the mid-20th century, it dominated among scholars who relied mainly on the message of Nicephorus Gregoras. For example, Konstantin Jireček adhered to the point of view that Milutin was the first husband of Elizabeth. Vladimir Ćorović also attributed the marriage of Milutin and Elizabeth to the period before 1284 and wrote: “He [Milutin] married a second time to Elizabeth, the sister of his sister-in-law Katharina, Dragutin's wife. Elizabeth was a nun. From her he had a daughter with a strange name. After a short time, in 1284, he drove her away”. Some modern historians (Ljubomir Maksimović, Svetislav Mandić and Željko Fajfrić) not only agree with this traditional version, but include the Serbian wife Jelena in the list of Milutin's wives.

Supporters of these versions, who believe that Milutin's relationship with Elizabeth took place before the marriage with Ana Terter, cite the following arguments, in addition to the message of Nicephorus Gregoras:

- Elizabeth's brother, King Ladislaus IV of Hungary, died in 1290. In this regard, a marriage with Elizabeth after 1290 would not have benefited Milutin.
- In the Hungarian sources in the period 1283–1285, Elizabeth is not mentioned.
- Hungarian sources never mentioned her after 1285 as a priorissa of the monastery. The reason could be her leaving to Serbia, and marrying with Milutin.
- The only source which claimed Elizabeth marriage with Milutin after Zavis, the Anonymi Descriptio Europae Orientalis was influenced by the French relatives of the Anjou dynasty, whose claim to the Hungarian throne was based on their descent from Mary, Elizabeth's sister. If Elizabeth was the older, her and her children's claim would be stronger. As a result, the Descriptio consistently ruined the claims of Elizabeth and Catherine to the Hungarian throne, after accused them to be Orthodox Christians and have a sinful life.
- According to Kanyó, Elizabeth was an old woman in the medieval sentiment, if she married with Milutin after 1292. She was 37, and maybe she was too old to bear and born one or more children for Milutin.
- Elizabeth was a distant relative of King Andrew III of Hungary, who started to rule from 1290. Andrew was supported by Archbishop Lodomer, the most important enemy of Elizabeth, and Andrew used his Italian relatives for making allies with marriages on the Balkan. Milutin did not gain any political advantages if he marries with Elizabeth.

===== After 1290 =====
Other studies on Milutin's personal life also take into account alternative sources. These versions are based, among other things, on the Anonymi Descriptio Europae Orientalis of 1308, which directly indicates that the marriage with Milutin was concluded after the execution of Záviš of Falkenstein:

The fourth daughter of Stephen of Hungary was tonsured into a monastery, where she remained until the age of 32, after which she left her nun robes and married a Bohemian nobleman, and after the death of the latter, to King Raska, to whom she gave birth to a daughter.

— Anonymi Descriptio Europae Orientalis, 1308.

Thus, according to this version, she could become Milutin's wife, even if not recognized by the church, not earlier than 1290. The historian V. Bastovanović dates the beginning of the marriage (or illegal cohabitation) of Elizabeth and Milutin between 1292 and 1296.

- One of the arguments in favor was the political situation: in 1292, the marriage with Ana Terter ceased to be useful to Milutin, since her father was no longer a King, and her brother lived as a hostage in the Horde. (Note: George Terter I was forced to give his daughter in marriage to Chaka, the son of Nogai Khan, and send his son and heir Theodore Svetoslav as a hostage to the Golden Horde and recognize himself as a vassal of Nogai Khan, but this did not save his domains from the raids of the Tatars. As a result, George abdicated and fled to Byzantium in 1292.) Therefore, it is possible that Ana lived separately from Milutin since 1292.
- Confirmation that Milutin didn't live with Ana in 1296 is the fact that she is absent from the fresco painted in 1296 in the Church of St. Achillius in Arilje: in the narthex of the temple on the south wall are St. Achillius, Milutin, Dragutin and Dragutin's wife Catherine of Hungary. In this case, it's likely that it was at this time, in 1292/96–1299, that Milutin lived with Elizabeth. The Serbian Church didn't recognize this relationship, and nowhere in the chronicles was Elizabeth mentioned as the "Queen of the Serbs". The Anonymi Descriptio Europae Orientalis report says that "Milutin had many wives at the same time"; probably this meant that during 1292/96–1299, both Ana Terter and Elizabeth were wives of Milutin.
- Supporters of this version cite the letter of Archbishop Lodomer of Esztergom from 8 May 1288. When informing the Pope about Elizabeth's escape from the monastery, the Archbishop said that she had lived there until she was 32 years old before escaping with Záviš of Falkenstein, and didn't mention Milutin at all.

Milutin's wives according to...
| George Pachymeres | Nicephorus Gregoras | Guillaume Adam | Željko Fajfrić and Ljubomir Maksimović | V. Bastovanović |
|---|---|---|---|---|
| 1) Jelena (Serbian noblewoman) (1272–1282, repudiated; d. 1298) | | | 1) Jelena (Serbian noblewoman) (1272–1282, repudiated; d. 1298) | 1) Jelena (Serbian noblewoman) (1272–1282, repudiated; d. 1298) |
| 2) Daughter of John I Doukas of Thessaly (1282–1283, repudiated) | 1) Daughter of John I Doukas of Thessaly (1272/82–1283, repudiated) | | 2) Daughter of John I Doukas of Thessaly (1282–1283, repudiated) | 2) Daughter of John I Doukas of Thessaly (1282–1283, repudiated) |
| | | | | 3) Ana Terter of Bulgaria (1284–1296, repudiated) |
| Elizabeth of Hungary (concubinage [marriage not recognized by Church] 1283–1284, repudiated) | 2) Elizabeth of Hungary (1283–1284, repudiated) | 1) Elizabeth of Hungary (?–1299, repudiated) | 3) Elizabeth of Hungary (1279/83–1284, repudiated) | Elizabeth of Hungary (concubinage [marriage not recognized by Church] 1292/96–1299, repudiated) |
| 3) Ana Terter of Bulgaria (1284–1299, repudiated) | 3) Ana Terter of Bulgaria (1284–1299, repudiated) | | 4) Ana Terter of Bulgaria (1284–1296, repudiated) | |
| 4) Simonis Palaiologina (1299–1321, death of Milutin) | 4) Simonis Palaiologina (1299–1321, death of Milutin) | 2) Simonis Palaiologina (1299–1321, death of Milutin) | 5) Simonis Palaiologina (1299–1321, death of Milutin) | 4) Simonis Palaiologina (1299–1321, death of Milutin) |

=== Issue ===
From Záviš of Falkenstein:

1. Son (born late 1288 – probably died young); sources confused him with Janos of Falkenstein, son of Zavis and Dowager Queen Kunigunda of Halych.

From Stefan Uroš II Milutin:

1. Zorica whose strange name (unusually remarked by contemporary sources) probably meaning "Queen" (Latin: Zariza, Zarizam, Serbian Cyrillic: Carica [Царица]). In 1308, Milutin began negotiations with Charles, Count of Valois for a marriage proposal between their families and turned to Pope Clement V for help in this matter. However, he soon realized that such alliance would not bring any benefits for him; the negotiations didn't have far-reaching consequences, but in the documents preserved Milutin promised to give his daughter Zorica as a wife to Charles, second son of Charles of Valois. In addition to Milutin's agreement with Charles of Valois, Zorica is mentioned in the Anonymi Descriptio Europae Orientalis of 1308. She is also depicted in frescos at Gračanica and Visoki Dečani.
2. Ana (also named Neda; (Note: Recent Bulgarian historians call her Anna-Neda (with a dash), but she is never attested sporting a two-element name. Although it has been posited that she was born Neda, and received the name Anna upon her marriage, it now appears that she received the name Dominica (Доминика) as convert to Catholic Christianity, which was interpreted as Neda in Slavic, coming from "недеља" (nedelja) in Serbian, which means "Sunday" (i.e. "Dius Domini").) Bulgarian and Serbian Cyrillic: Анна-Неда), the first wife of Michael Asen III, Tsar of Bulgaria and mother of Ivan Stephen. According to a letter by Robert, King of Naples, Anna was his cousin, while a letter by Robert's nephew and grandson-in-law King Louis I of Naples indicates that Anna's son Lodovico was his second cousin, since Louis descended from Maria of Hungary, Elisabeth's sister. Thus, Anna could only have been a daughter of Elizabeth.
3. Stefan Konstantin. Supporters of the version that Milutin was Elizabeth's first husband argue that she was his mother.

=== Last years, death and legend ===
In 1290, while King Ladislaus IV was still alive, Elizabeth was last mentioned in Hungarian documents – in one of the King's letter she was called "our beloved sister". From 1290 to 1300, there is no documentary evidence about the life of Elizabeth. On 9 July 1300, she left Hungary for Manfredonia in the Kingdom of Naples at the side of her sister Mary, wife of King Charles II of Naples. In 1301, Elizabeth was veiled as a nun for the second time at the Dominican Monastery of San Pietro, founded by Charles II. In subsequent years, she was occasionally mentioned in the documents of the Kingdom of Naples:

- According to an entry dated 2 March 1303, Elizabeth was allocated 30 ounces of gold per year for maintenance.
- On 18 November 1306, she paid off the debt of Charles II.
- On 9 July 1308 and in 1313, Elizabeth was mentioned in the documents of the monastery.

In the records of 1326 about the inheritance of Elizabeth's sister, Mary, who died in 1323, Elizabeth is mentioned as deceased. This means that Elizabeth died between 1313 and 1326. Perhaps, by the time of Mary's death in 1323, Elizabeth was no longer alive; there is unconfirmed evidence that she died before July 1322.

The burial place of Elizabeth is unknown. According to sources, she was buried in the Monastery of San Pietro. Legend of Saint Margaret written by Lea Ráskai and the later texts based on this source had called her burial place on Rabbits' Island, next to the grave of her father. Later excavations in Rabbits' Island (now Margaret Island) did not find any evidence of her grave.

Elizabeth was revered as Blessed. Jesuit Gábor Hevenesi (1656–1715), who wrote a book about the Holy Hungarian kings, dedicated a chapter to Elizabeth. In this account, there is no mention of her marriage to Milutin, and her marriage to Zavis is only briefly mentioned. According to the same account, Elizabeth strove to imitate her aunt, Saint Margaret; she left Hungary at the behest of the Pope and settled in a monastery built by her sister in Naples.

Kanyó supposed could be exist a tradition about her, based on the difference in her role between the early Latin texts of the Legend of Saint Margaret and the late Hungarian texts of Margaret's hagiography, but there is no more evidence. Kanyó suggested too, Elizabeth's false year of death (1285) in Hevenesi's work could be the date of her departure to Serbia.

== Sources ==
- Csepregi, Ildiko; Klaniczay, Gábor; Péterfi, Bence (2018). The Oldest Legend: Acts of the Canonization Process, and Miracles of Saint Margaret of Hungary. Central European University Press. ISBN 9789633862186.
- Fine, John Van Antwerp (1994). The Late Medieval Balkans: A Critical Survey from the Late Twelfth Century to the Ottoman Conquest. University of Michigan Press. ISBN 0472082604.
- Fraknói, Vilmos (1906). Mária, V. István király leánya, nápolyi királyné (PDF) (in Hungarian). Vol. 3. Budapesti Szemle. pp. 321–358.
- Kádár, Tamás (2011). A középkori magyar királyi és kormányzói családok tagjainak elhalálozási és temetési időpontjai valamint helyei 1301–1541 közö (PDF) (in Hungarian). Vol. XVIII. FONS (Forráskutatás és Történeti Segédtudományok). pp. 25–53.
- Kanyó, Ferenc (2018). Az apáca, a szerető, a királyné és a boldog. Egy életrajz az utolsó Árpádok idejéből [The nun, the lover, the queen and the blessed. A biography from the late Arpadian Era. Elisabeth of Hungary, Queen of Serbia] (in Hungarian). Gondolat Kiadó.
- Klaniczay, Gábor (2002). Holy Rulers and Blessed Princesses: Dynastic Cults in Medieval Central Europe. Cambridge University Press. ISBN 9780521420181.
- Konrád, Eszter (2022). Helisabet filia Stephani regis Ungarorum illustris : image of a saintly nun of the Arpad dynasty as reflected in hagiographic sources. Vol. 9. Convivium. pp. 136–153.
- Krastev, Krassimir (2006). Sŭdbata na bŭlgarskata tsarkinya Anna Terter (in Bulgarian) (V: Tangra. Sbornik v chest na 70-godishninata na akad. Vasil Gyuzelev. ed.). Sofia: СУ. pp. 649–657.
- Kristó, Gyula; Makk, Ferenc (1996). Az Árpád-ház uralkodói [Rulers of the House of Árpád] (in Hungarian). I.P.C. Könyvek. ISBN 963-7930-97-3.
- Makkai, László; Mezey, László (1960). Árpád-kori és Anjou-kori levelek: XI-XIV. század (PDF) (in Hungarian). Gondolat Kiadó.
- Malamut, Élisabeth (2000). "Les Reines de Milutin". Byzantinische Zeitschrift (in French). 93 (2) (2 ed.): 490–507. doi:10.1515/BZ-2000-0207. S2CID 191389841.
- Mandić, Svetislav (1990). Carski čin Stefana Nemanje: činjenice i pretpostavke o srpskom srednjovekovlju (in Serbian). Srpska književna zadruga.
- Mladjov, Ian (2011). "The Bulgarian Prince and would-be Emperor Lodovico." Bulgaria Mediaevalis 2: 603–618. online
- Radojčić, Svetozar (1934). Portreti srpskih vladara u Srednjem veku (in Croatian). U Ljubljani, Delniška tiskarna.
- Szabó, Károly (1886). Kun László, 1272-1290 (in Hungarian). Budapest: V. Mehner kiad.
- Stanković, Vlada (2017). Portraits of Medieval Eastern Europe, 900–1400 // PART 3: Byzantium and South Eastern Europe — King Milutin and his many marriages (Donald Ostrowski, Christian Raffensperger ed.). Routledge. ISBN 9781351790222.
- Uzelac, Aleksandar (2014). О српској принцези и бугарској царици Ани (прилог познавању бракова краља Милутина) (in Serbian). Vol. 63. Историјски часопис. pp. 29–46.
- Wertner, Mór (1892). Az Árpádok családi története (in Hungarian) (Nagy-becskereken, Pleitz Fer. Pál könyvnyomdája ed.). Nagy-becskereken, Pleitz Fer. Pál könyvnyomdája.
- Živković, Tibor; Petrović, Vladeta; Uzelac, Aleksandar; Kunčer, Dragana (2013). Anonymi Descriptio Europae Orientalis : Anonimov opis istočne Evrope (in Serbian) (Izvori za srpsku istoriju ed.). Istorijski institut. ISBN 9788677431020.
- Živković, Vojislav (2022). "Hungarian Princess Jelisaveta Arpad". Седам векова од упокојења Светог краља Милутина - тематски зборник. ур. Влада Станковић, Драгољуб Марјановић. Врање: Свеправославно друштво "Преподобни Јустин Ћелијски и Врањски" (in Serbian): 110–124.
- "Petri Zittaviensis Cronica Aule Regie". clavmon.cz.

Royal titles
| Preceded by Helena Doukaina Angelina | Queen consort of Serbia | Succeeded by Anna Terter of Bulgaria |
