= Stefan Konstantin =

King of Serbia from 1321 to 1322

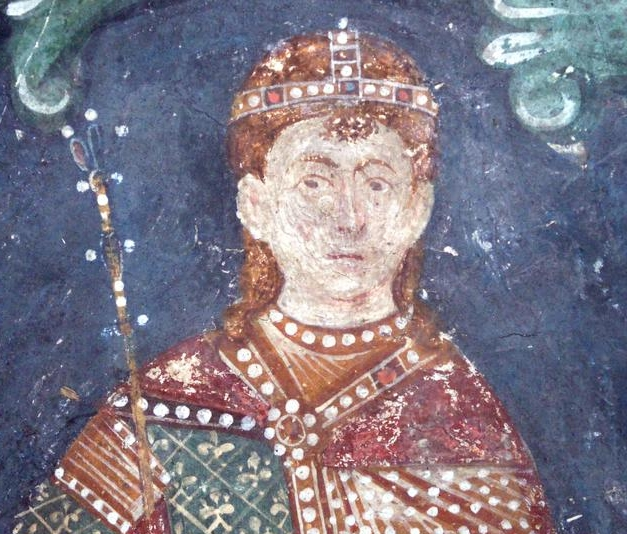
- Gračanica fresco, representing Konstantin at c. 1320

King of Serbia
- Reign: 29 October 1321 – spring 1322
- Predecessor: Stefan Uroš II Milutin
- Successor: Stefan Uroš III Dečanski
- Born: c. 1283
- Died: spring of 1322; Mitrovičko Polje, Zvečan
- Dynasty: Nemanjić
- Father: Stefan Uroš II Milutin
- Mother: Helena Doukaina Angelina (?)
- Religion: Eastern Orthodox Christianity

Stefan Konstantin (Serbian Cyrillic: Стефан Константин; c. 1283–1322) was the King of Serbia from 29 October 1321 to the spring of 1322. The younger son of King Stefan Milutin (1253–1321), he initially held the appanage of Zeta (with Zahumlje and Travunia), and was the heir to the Serbian throne after his father had exiled his elder brother Stefan. After his father's death, a throne struggle broke out between Konstantin, Stefan and their cousin Vladislav II, evolving into the two years long civil war. He was killed in the battle fighting his brother, who went on to defeat Vladislav, too, and gained the Serbian throne as Stefan Uroš III, better known as Stefan Dečanski.

Life of Konstantin, who may even be canonized in Middle Ages, was obscured even in medieval chronicles while today is almost completely forgotten. Nearly all data on him are approximate and has to be extrapolated from other biographies. Apparently not much valued by his contemporaries, even by his own father who appointed him a successor only when had no other options, he met a cruel death by the hand of his own brother, losing the throne to which he lawfully succeeded.

== Early life ==
Regarding Konstantin's personal data, the only confirmed information is that he was the son of king Milutin. His mother, birth date or even the birth sequence between him and his brother and sisters are unknown. This is the result of the missing timetable for a string of five marriages king Milutin had, which is among the largest problems in the Serbian medieval biographical research, as Serbian medieval chronologies and genealogies make no mention neither of Milutin's wives nor his daughters. By traditional historiography, Milutin married five times: 1) Jelena, Serbian noblewoman; 2) Helena, Greek noblewoman; 3) Elizabeth, Hungarian princess; 4) Anna, Bulgarian princess; 5) Simonida, Byzantine princess.

Aleksa Ivić placed Konstantin as the youngest child of Milutin, while giving birth date of c. 1274 for his brother Stefan Dečanski. This is in line with Stefan Dečanski's marriage date of 1299, or 1296 by the Bulgarian sources, to Bulgarian princess Teodora. Especially taking into the account that some sources claim he was already married previously to an unnamed woman, but the union was childless.

Vladimir Ćorović claimed that Konstantin was the older son, while he considered Stefan Dečanski a child of Milutin's fourth wife Anna, who married the king in 1284. As she was only 5 years old when married to Milutin, and was expelled by Milutin in 1299 when she was 19 or 20 years old, it is unlikely that she had (two) children with him, especially considering the dates from Stefan Dečanski's later life. According to the Serbian redaction of the Troitsky Manuscript, Milutin, Anna and "their children" were mentioned, however, in the original writings she is mentioned as the stepmother to Milutin's children. Bulgarian historian and cleric from the 14th and 15th century, Gregory Tsamblak, was adamant that the royal couple had no children. This leaves Konstantin as the younger son of Milutin.

Ćorović also claims that Konstantin was Milutin's son from his first marriage, but as one of the reasons why people sided with Stefan Dečanski during the war, he cited Stefan's fully Slavic origin, referring to his Bulgarian mother. However, Milutin's first wife, Jelena, was not only of Slavic, but of Serbian origin. This leaves Milutin's two foreign wives, Greek Helena and Hungarian Elizabeth, as possible mothers of Konstantin. Sometime in 1282 Milutin expelled his first wife Jelena and married Helena. He then expelled Helena, too, at the end of 1283, and married Elizabeth, who was expelled also, before August 1284. Given these dates, Konstatin may be born in 1283 by Helena.

Based on his appearance on the fresco in the Gračanica Monastery, which was built from 1315 to 1321, historian Dejan Ječmenica concluded that Konstantin may be born in the final years of the 13th century, since he appears to be "some twenty years old" on the painting. This contradicts Konstantin's 1303 appointment as the administrator of Nevesinje. However it is in line with some modern historians who partially reversed the timetable of Milutin's marriages and corresponding, assigned motherhood of his children, which makes possible for Elizabeth to be Konstantin's mother, but also moves her marriage to the 1290s and prolongs it for years.

== Heir ==
As a prince, Konstantin held the župa (county) of Nevesinje from 1303 to 1306. As this area was part of Hum (or Zahumlje), he was also called the regent of Hum.

As it was common in Serbia at the time for older son and presumable heir ("Young King") to be given the administration over Zeta (modern Montenegro), with the accompanying style of the King of Zeta, Milutin gave the position to Stefan Dečanski. However, Stefan was unsatisfied with his prospects of inheriting the crown since the marriage with his mother was annulled, making him an illegitimate child. Also pushed by the local nobility, Stefan started the rebellion against his father in 1314 which was quickly quashed with Milutin personally heading the army. Stefan fled across the Bojana river but Milutin offered negotiations. Stefan accepted, but Milutin shackled him instead and ordered for Stefan to be blinded (which wasn't conducted properly due to the bribery) and expelled to Constantinople. Milutin then appointed Konstantin to administer Zeta.

Konstantin was declared King of Zeta and minted his own money in Shkodër. Silver coins represented Konstantin sitting on the throne had inscriptions "Dominus rex Constantinus" and "Sanctus Stefanus Scutari" on the obverse and reverse, respectively. He was also sent by his father in diplomatic missions. In October 1321, when Milutin died, Konstantin was in Constantinople, hiring additional military forces for the warfare with the Hungarians.

However, neither the historians, nor Milutin himself, apparently held no high regard for Konstantin. Though his father gave him Zeta to rule, he didn't declare him heir apparent right away. He seemingly had no better opinion on his other son, Stefan, as even during the time when both of his sons were in Serbia, Milutin was prospecting to appoint one of the Byzantine princes as his heir. His last mother-in-law, Byzantine empress consort Irene, mother of Milutin's another child bride Simonis, sent in time two of her sons to Milutin. Younger prince Demetrios refused the post as he disliked Serbia, and the attempt with the older prince, Theodore, also failed. On 12 March 1316, Milutin's older brother, king Stefan Dragutin, died. As per the power-sharing 1282 Deževa Agreement between the brothers, Dragutin's heir, Vladislav II, was to become the paramount king of Serbia and not only of the northern Realm of Stefan Dragutin, while Milutin will accept the vassal position to his nephew. Milutin had no intention of following the agreement. Not only that he didn't accept the kingship of Vladislav, he attacked new king's domain in the north and captured him.

Only after all this, when he was left without other possibilities (blind and expelled Stefan, failed attempts with brothers-in-law, possible pretenders from Dragutin's line), Milutin named Konstantin as his heir, and began to prepare him for succession. Naming happened sometime in 1317 or after, as Milutin mentions Konstantin as his heir in his endowment to the Bari Cathedral which included a silver altar with Konstantin's inscribed name. In his father's major endowment, the Gračanica Monastery, which was built in this period, Konstantin was portrayed twice. On the fresco which represents family tree of the dynasty, he was placed on his father's right side. He is also present on the fresco with his father and grandparents, Stefan Uroš I and Helen of Anjou. His brother Stefan is absent from the paintings.

After 7 years, under the influence of clergy and especially of Serbian archbishop Nikodim I, Milutin allowed Stefan Dečanski to return to Serbia from Constantinople in 1321. He gave him to administer the župa of Budimlja, but kept Stefan's oldest son, future emperor Stefan Dušan at his court. Stefan Dečanski's return didn't change anything in Konstantin's designation as the heir. Milutin was already old and ill and certain groups again influenced Stefan to rebel and overthrow his father, but this time Stefan refused. However, he used his father's illness to prepare for the time after Milutin's death, organizing a strong party of followers.

== Kingship ==
King Milutin died on 29 October 1321. Untrustworthy towards anyone, he didn't arrange the proper transition. Though naming Konstantin as his heir in public at least since 1319, he never actually issued any official decree confirming that or declared him as such in the state assembly, which prompted some historians to refer to Konstantin as the alleged heir. Danilo II, Serbian archbishop and one of the main medieval chroniclers, was the staunch supporter of Stefan Dečanski and wrote that Milutin left no official successor as he lost ability to speak due to his illness.

At the time of Milutin's death, Konstantin was in Constantinople, drafting the army of mercenaries. Stefan Dečanski, who was in Serbia, upon hearing the news of his father's death, took down the bandages from his eyes (which he kept for years, pretending to be blind) and declared that Saint Nicholas miraculously restored his sight. As blindness was one of the reasons he was excluded from the succession, Stefan now reclaimed his right to the throne. Using commotion which followed after the death of Milutin, his imprisoned nephew Vladislav fled and also restored his claim to the throne.

Konstantin returned from Constantinople and continued to mint coins, use the title of king and oppose other two claimants. Venetian chronicles from this period refer to him as "king" (rex). Stefan was more popular. He prepared himself well, he was a favorite of the church, his life was seen as an ordeal and martyrdom by the population who believed his miraculous healing, and he was of fully Slavic origin. Konstantin apparently failed to grasp and prevent both the Stefan's popularity and high regard he had in Serbian society. By the next year, the highest ranked members of the clergy officially turned back on Konstantin and archbishop Nikodim II crowned Stefan Dečanski on the Epiphany, 6 January 1322, in the Žiča monastery.

=== Civil war ===
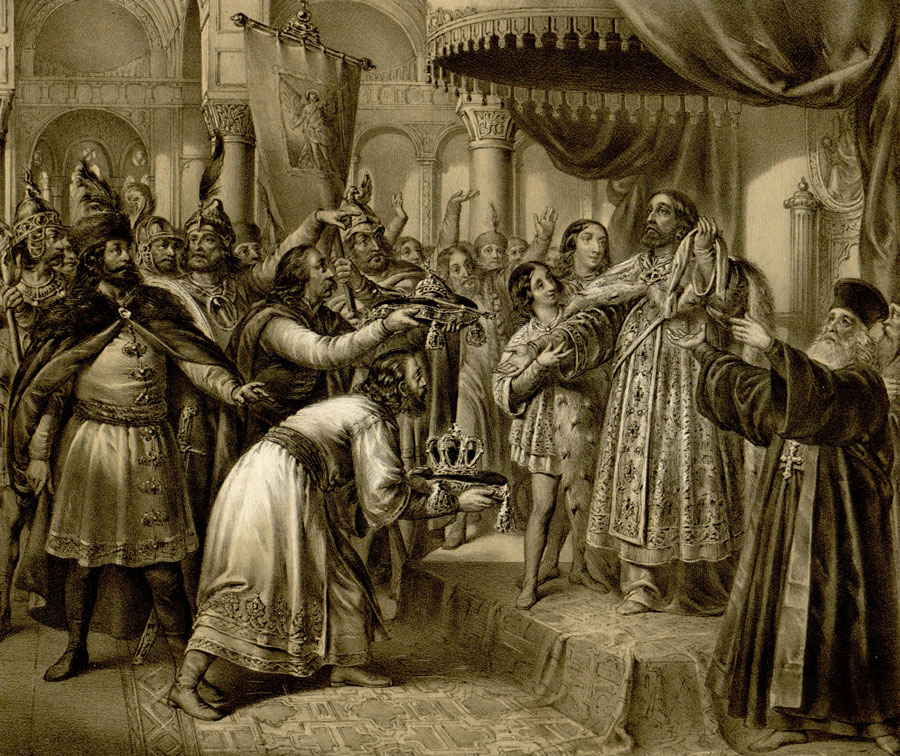
Coronation of Stefan Dečanski on 6 January 1322 triggered the civil war in which Konstantin ultimately lost his life

With Vladislav II, claiming the title since 12 March 1316, and Konstantin, succeeding to Milutin on 29 October 1321, Serbia now had three proclaimed kings, which was a situation that couldn't last for long. The first skirmishes began after Stefan's coronation. Stefan offered Konstantin the power-sharing agreement where Konstantin would "accept another dignified realm, as the second son". Though some historians use just the term "power share", it was obvious that what Stefan offered was not an equal, co-ruling status for Konstantin.

Konstantin declined Stefan's offer. He considered himself a rightful heir and seems that he didn't believe Stefan regained his vision, as he stated that "it doesn't suite for blind man to rule". Also, Konstantin thought he would prevail due to the army of foreign mercenaries he organized on his father's orders, starting with his visit to Constantinople in 1321. Some sources point to the possibility that Stefan offered to share the power cause he may be initially reluctant to use force, as they report that Konstantin actually "forced out" the warfare.

The war was described as "lasting long and fought severely". From the outside, Stefan was supported by the Byzantines, as during his exile in Constantinople he was sheltered by the emperor Andronikos II Palaiologos and later, after he secured Serbian throne, he married Andronik's great-niece Maria. Vladislav was supported by the gentry in northern Serbia and by the king Charles I of Hungary. According to Serbian epic poetry, in simplified form, Konstantin was supported by the Bulgarians, Vladislav was a Hungarian candidate while Stefan Dečanski was supported by the Byzantines, but there is no evidence that Bulgarians held Konstantin's side. Actually, they indirectly helped Vladislav, which is why bishop Danilo (II), was sent to Veliko Tarnovo in Bulgaria to negotiate peace.

The final battle between the armies of Konstantin and Stefan occurred below the Zvečan fortress, in the Mitrovica field (Dmitrovačko Polje or Mitrovičko Polje), sometime in the spring of 1322. Stefan Dečanski bribed part of Konstantin's army, so some troops switched sides during the battle, abandoning Konstantin. All available sources agree that Konstantin was heavily defeated in the battle, not surviving it.

After defeating Konstantine, Stefan Dečanski was now able to focus on the northern throne contender, Vladislav II. Having much larger support than Konstantin (rulers of Hungary and Bosnia, local nobility), Vladislav proved out to be also a tougher opponent. The war continued for two more years, until the spring of 1324, when Vladislav was finally defeated. He fled to Hungary, while Stefan Dečanski became the sole ruler Serbia.

=== Death ===
Exact date and circumstances of Konstantin's death are not known, just as those of his birth. Gregory Tsamblak and Serbian 17th-century Pejatović Chronicle claim he was killed in the battlefield. Other sources claim he was either captured or killed during the retreat of the remains of his army. That way, Konstantin was the first Nemanjić killed in battle since the Battle of Pantina, dated sometime in 1166–1168, when Tihomir Zavidović perished in fighting. Coincidentally, both battles were fought between two Nemanjić brothers and both took place at Zvečan.

A 1332 work, variously attributed to the Dominican Pseudo-Brocard, or to the Roman Catholic cleric Guillaume Adam, depicts Konstantin's more gruesome ending. Allegedly, Stefan ordered for captured Konstantin to be laid on the plank of wood, with his arms and thighs nailed to the wood. He was then sawed in half. Modern historians disregard such account of events, preferring the Camblak's account as more believable. Also, the entire chronicle has strong anti-Stefan sentiment while Adam was notorious for his negative attitude towards Serbs, calling them the "snake batch". This manner of death resembles the Biblical tale of the Crucifixion of Jesus, and as Stefan had no reason to make a martyr out of Konstantin, it is believed that Adam fabricated the story altogether.

However, several other variants of Konstantin's grisly death survived. Ragusan chronicler Mavro Orbini adopted Adam's account in his 1601 Kingdom of the Slavs, but makes a point that it was actually Vladislav who captured and tortured Konstantin. According to the folk poetry, recorded by Vuk Karadžić, the mercenaries bribed by Stefan Dečanski were those who nailed him to the plank and sawed him in half, throwing the remains into the river (Ibar ?). Folk myths tell stories of Stefan beheading Konstantin, silver plating his skull into the cup and drinking wine from it.

Resting place of Konstantin is also unknown for sure. Old Serbian chronicles claim he was buried in Zvečan. There were two churches, dedicated to Saint Nicholas and Saint George. Archaeological surveys in the Church of Saint George showed that not only Konstantin, but no one was buried there. Close to Zvečan is the Banjska Monastery, the endowment and planned burial church of his father, king Milutin, so it is believed that Konstantin was buried there. In four of the chronicles, "holy relics" of Konstantin were mentioned, which indicated that, at some point, he was canonized and declared a saint.

== Assessment and legacy ==
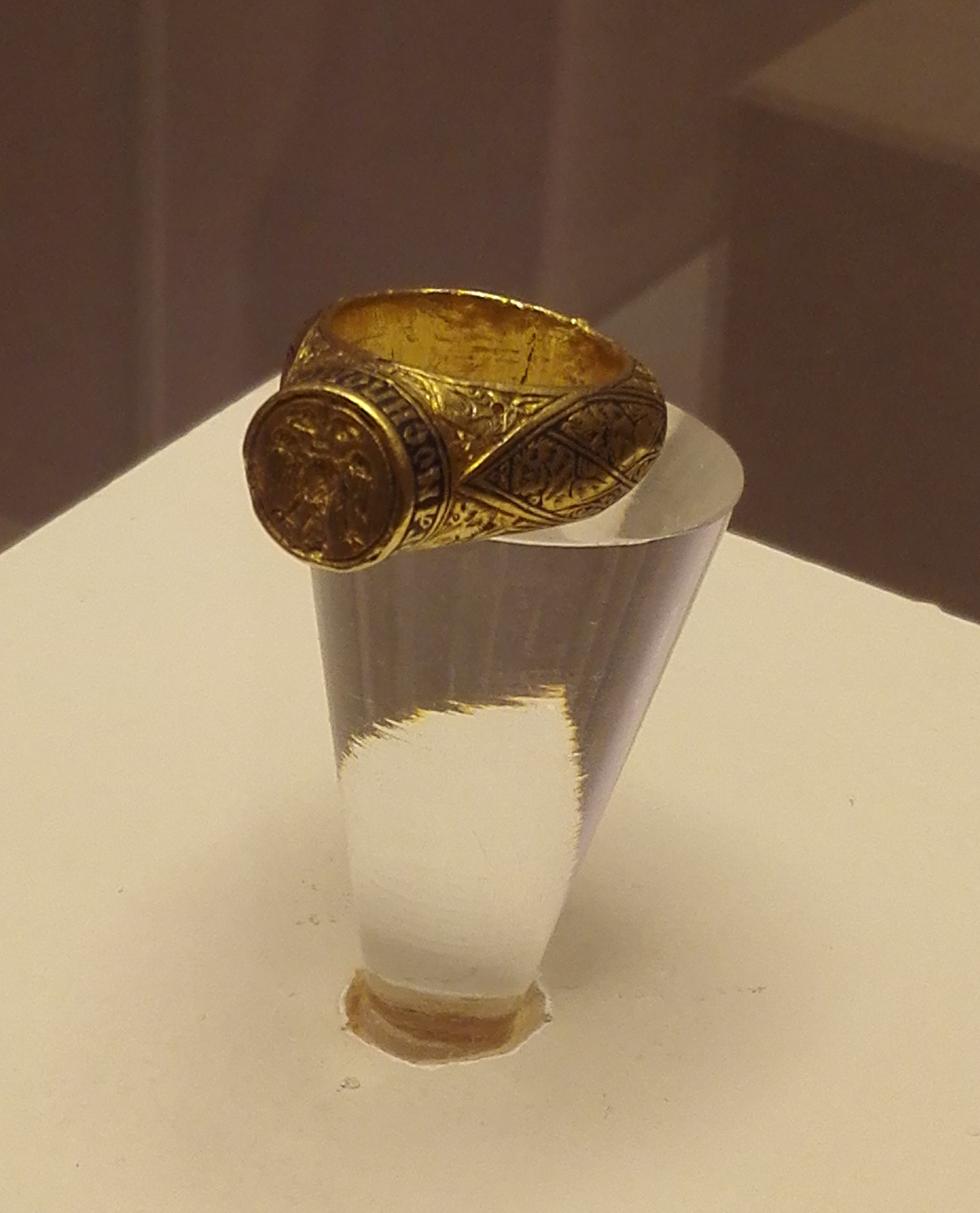
Stefan Konstantin's ring, exhibited in the National Museum of Serbia

Despite Milutin's final intention to groom Konstantin as his heir, and his willingness for military confrontation against Stefan Dečanski to keep the throne, historians described him as a "little known", "apparently an heir" and an anti-king even though he was a designated successor. He has also been labeled as not having any special treats and values, being a weak man and a person who didn't excel in anything. Danilo's Disciple and Continuators, scholars who continued chronological work of Danilo II, completely ignored the civil war and turmoil after Milutin's death.

Konstantin was mentioned in several Serbian medieval chronologies and genealogies (rodoslov): Koporinjski, Studenički, Cetinjski, Vrhobreznički, Senički. His name remains preserved at the altar in Bari, Italy, and his image remained on the frescoes in the Gračanica Monastery. However, in the large Nemanjić family tree fresco in the monastery of Visoki Dečani, built by his brother Stefan who defeated him, Konstantin is not present. Modern writings dealing with Konstantin include works Comes Constantinus ["Count Konstantin"] by Mihailo Dinić (1961), Konstantin, sin kralja Milutina ["Konstantin, son of king Milutin"] by Marica Malović-Đukić (1985), and Nemanjići drugog reda ["Members of the Nemanjić dynasty of the second order"] by Dejan Ječmenica (2018).

A ring from the Banjska Monastery, originating from the early 14th century, is kept in the National Museum in Belgrade. Until recently, it was thought the ring belonged to Stefan Dečanski's first wife, Teodora. Modern historians assigned the ring to Konstantin.

Konstantin provided long lists of Byzantine, Bulgarian and Serbian monarchs from the 11th century onward, as his father had done before him.

The Vasojevići, one of the Serbian Highland tribes of Montenegro, and their progenitor Vaso, were mentioned for the first time in a document found in an Ragusan archive, dated to 1444. According to the Vasojevići folklore, Vaso was a great-grandson of Stefan Konstantin. The family myth claims that Konstantin had a son, Stefan Vasoje, who in turn, had a son Stefan Konstantin I, also called Stevo Vasojević in folk epic poetry, who was killed on 15 June 1389 in the Battle of Kosovo. Stefan Konstantin I had five sons – Oto, Kraso, Ozro, Pipo and Vaso, founder of the clan. Given the importance of the Vasojevići, especially of their diaspora, and following the myth of their origin which exists only in oral tradition though, the historic and modern descendants of Stefan Konstantin would be rebellion leader Karađorđe, brothers footballers and co-founders of Galatasaray Milija and Pavle Bakić, politician Slobodan Milošević, model and actress Milla Jovovich or tennis player Jelena Janković.

== Sources ==
- Božić, Ivan (1979). Nemirno Pomorje XV veka [Restless Littoral in XV century]. Novi Sad: Srpska Književna Zadruga.
- Bubalo, Đorđe (2008). Ljušić, Radoš (ed.). Енциклопедија српског народа [Encyclopedia of Serbia people]. Belgrade: Zavod za udžbenike. ISBN 978-86-17-15732-4.
- Camblak, Grigorije (1989). Књижевни рад у Србији [Literary work in Serbia]. Prosveta, Srpska Književna Zadruga.
- Ćirković, Sima (2004). The Serbs. Malden: Blackwell Publishing. ISBN 9781405142915.
- Ćorović, Vladimir (2005). Ilustrovana istorija Srba Илустрована историја Срба, друга књига [Illustrated history of the Serbs, book II]. Politika, Narodna Knjiga. ISBN 86-331-2521-8.
- Danilo Drugi (2008). Животи краљева и архиепископа српских - службе [Lives of Serbian kings and archbishops]. Prosveta. ISBN 978-86-07-01798-0.
- Danilovi Nastavljači (1989). Данилови настављачи - Данилов Ученик, други настављачи Даниловог зборника [Danilo's Continuators - Danilo's Disciple, other continuators of Danilo's Collections]. Belgrade: Prosveta, Srpska Književna Zadruga.
- Dinić, Mihailo (1961). "Comes Constantinus". Zbornik radova Vizantološkog instituta. 7: 1–11.
- Đukić, S. Васојевиће и Васојевићи [Vasojeviće and Vasojevići] (PDF). Archived from the original (PDF) on 25 April 2012.
- Fajfrić, Željko (1998). Sveta loza Stefana Nemanje [Holy bloodline of Stefan Nemanja]. Projekat Rastko. ISBN 978-86-85269-06-6.
- Glas Javnosti (17 July 2000). "Mila Jovović peva zanimljive pesme" [Milla Jovovich sings interesting songs]. Belgrade: Glas Javnosti.
- Ječmenica, Dejan (2018). Nemanjići drugog reda [Members of the Nemanjić dynasty of the second order]. Faculty of Philosophy, University of Belgrade. ISBN 9788664270946.
- Karadžić, Vuk Stefanović; Holton, Milne; Mihailovich, Vasa D. (1997). Songs of the Serbian people: from the collections of Vuk Karadžić. University of Pittsburgh Press. ISBN 978-0-8229-3952-8.
- Krastev, Krasimir (2006). Съдбата на българската царкиня Анна Тертер [Wedding of Bulgarian empress Anna Terter]. Sofia University. ISBN 9789540724355.
- Logos, Aleksandar A. (2017). ISTORIJA SRBA I, Beograd 2017.PDF Историја Срба I [History of the Serbs I]. Belgrade: ATC. ISBN 978-86-85117-37-4.
- "Macedonian studies, Issue 2". Macedonian Studies. Research Programme for Macedonian Studie. 1988.
- Malović Đukić, Marica (1985). = Константин, син краља Милутина [Konstantin, son of king Milutin]. Историјски записи. 3–4: 69–75.
- Marjanović Dušanić, Smilja (1997). Владарска идеологија Немањића [Ruling ideology of the Nemanjić dynasty]. Srpska Književna Zadruga. ISBN 9788637906377.
- Marjanović Dušanić, Smilja (2007). "Sveti kralj - Kult Stefana Dečanskog" [The Holy King - The Cult of St.Stefan of Dečani]. Balcanica (XXXIX). Clio: 307–310.
- Matica Srpska (2011). Српски биографски речник 5, Кв-Мао [Serbian biographical dictionary V, Kv-Mao]. Novi Sad: Matica Srpska. ISBN 978-86-7946-085-1.
- Mihić, Ljubo (1975). Ljubinje sa okolinom [Ljubinje and surroundings]. Dragan Srnić.
- Miljković, Bojan (2007). Немањићи и Свети Никола у Барију [Nemanjić dynasty and Saint Nicholas in Bari]. SANU's Institute for Byzantology.
- Nicol, Donald M. (1984). The Despotate of Epiros 1267-1479: A Contribution to the History of Greece. Cambridge University Press.
- Nikolić, Dejan (1996). Svi vladari Srbije [All rulers of Serbia]. Narodna biblioteka "Resavska škola".
- Novaković, Stojan (1894). Буркард и Бертрандон де ла Брокијер о Балканском полуострву 14. и 15. века [Brocardus and Bertrandon de la Broquière on Balkan Peninsula in the 14th and 15th century]. Godišnjica Nikole Čupića - Book XIV. pp. 1–66.
- Orbini, Mavro (1999). Šanjek, Franjo (ed.). Kraljevstvo Slavena [Kingdom of the Slavs]. Zagreb: Narodne Novine.
- Purković, Miodrag (2002). Авињонске папе и српске земље: Светитељски култови у старој српској држави, репринт из 1934 [Popes of Avignon and Serbian lands: cults of the saints in old Serbian state (reprint from 1934)]. Gornji Milanovac: LIO. ISBN 9788683697182.
- Samardžić, Obrad Mićov; Samardžić, Mirjana; Samardžić, Saša; Samardžić, Saša (2006). Svadbe i pogrebni običaji pravoslavnih u Nevesinju [marriages and funeral customs of Orthodox adherents in Nevesinje]. Čigoja štampa. ISBN 9788675584117. "први познати господар жупе Невесиње спомиње се Константин Немањић (1303-1306)"
- Sekulović, Milutin (19 June 2014). "Galatasaraj pamti Vasojeviće" [Galatasaray remembers Vasojevići]. Belgrade: Večernje Novosti.
- Spasić, Dušan; Palavestra, Aleksandar; Mrđenović, Dušan (1991). Rodoslovne tablice i grbovi srpskih dinastija i vlastele Родословне таблице и грбови српских династија и властеле, 2. издање [Genealogy and coats of arms of Serbian dynasties and nobility, 2nd edition]. Belgrade: Bata. ISBN 86-7685-007-0.
- Todić, Branislav (1993). Краљ Милутин са сином Константином и родитељима монасима на фресци y Грачаници [King Milutin with son Konstantin and monastic parents on the Gračanica fresco] (PDF). Belgrade.
- Todić, Branislav (1999). Serbian Medieval Painting: The Age of King Milutin. Belgrade: Draganić. ISBN 9788644102717.
- Uzelac, Aleksandar (2015). Под сенком пса - Татари и јужнословенске земље у другој половини 13. века [Under the shadow of the dog - Tatars and South Slavic lands in the second half of the 13th century]. Utopija.
- Uzelac, Aleksandar (2014). O Srpskoj Princezi i Bugarskoj Carici Ani О српској принцези и бугарској царици Ани: прилог познавању бракова краља Милутина [About Serbian princess and Bulgarian empress Ana - addendum to the knowledge of King Milutin's marriages]. The Historical Review, vol. LXIII.
- Uzelac, Aleksandar (2012). Србија, Бугарска и Татари у другој половини 13. века [Serbia, Bulgaria and Tatars in the second half of the 13th century]. Faculty of Philosophy, University of Belgrade.
- Veselinović, Andrija (2008). Ljušić, Radoš (ed.). Енциклопедија српског народа [Encyclopedia of Serbia people]. Belgrade: Zavod za udžbenike. ISBN 978-86-17-15732-4.
- Vesović, Radoslav Jagoš V. (1935). Pleme Vasojevići [Vasojevići tribe]. Sarajevo: Državna Štampa u Sarajevu.

Stefan Konstantin Nemanjić dynasty Born: c. 1283 Died: spring 1322
Regnal titles
Preceded by Stefan Dečanski	Prince of Zeta; 1314–1322	Succeeded by Stefan Dušan
Preceded by Stefan Milutin	King of Serbia; 1321–1322	Succeeded by Stefan Dečanski
