= Jeleč =

Medieval fortification in southwestern Serbia

Town of Jeleč Јелеч
- Novi Pazar; Serbia
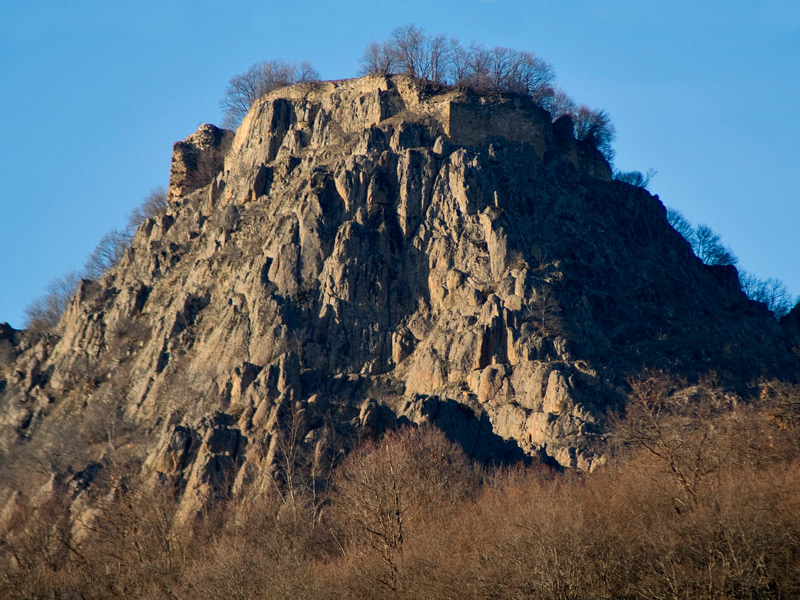
- Remains of Jeleč

Site information
- Type: Strategic fortification
- Open to the public: Yes

Location
- Coordinates: 43.0263°N 20.5612°E

Site history
- Built: 12th century
- Materials: Stone

Jeleč (Serbian Cyrillic: Јелеч) is a medieval fortification located in southwestern Serbia, 12 km south of present-day Novi Pazar, on one of the three peaks of Rogozna mountain. Today, the fortification is mostly in ruined state, however there are some well preserved parts.

== History ==
The area between Raška and Ibar, where the Rogozna mountain forms a natural border towards the Pannonian Basin, was the heart of the Serbian medieval state during the early reign of the Nemanjić dynasty, the Grand Principality of Serbia. Among many other obsolete medieval fortifications in Serbia, Jeleč stands out with its unusual position. It's built on one of the highest peaks of Rogozna mountain, at 1 262 m altitude, as an important strategic fort on the unstable frontier.

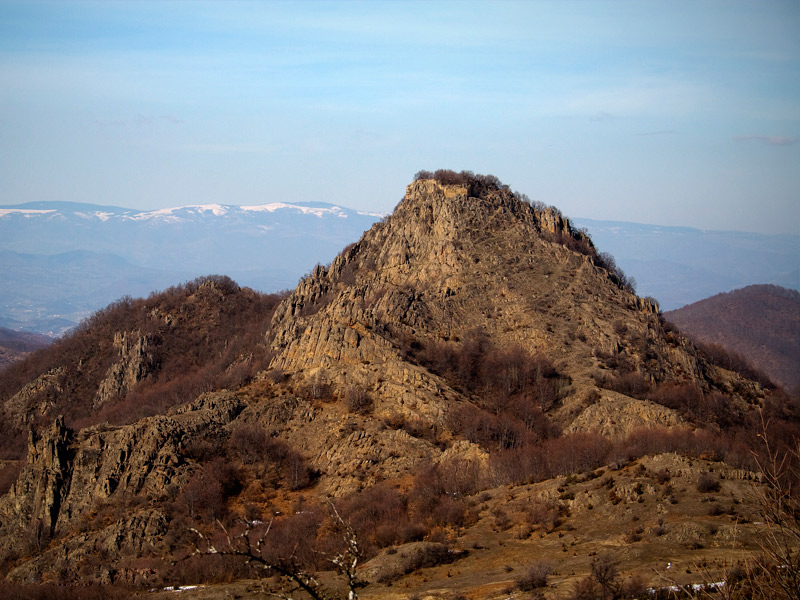
A look at the fortification from the nearby peak

The first certain mention of this town was in the second half of 13th century, but it was without a doubt built much earlier. Its position indicates that it had the most importance in pre-Nemanjić era of Serbia. The area which Jeleč dominates, was on the frontier towards Bulgarian and Byzantine lands during the early power struggles involving Serbia in early medieval period. During the reign of Stefan Nemanja it was a center of župa, a term for a district in medieval Serbia. It is believed that some rulers used Jeleč as their estate. In 1282 it was Jeleč where Stefan Dragutin broke his leg while hunting and became ill; he passed the throne to his younger brother Stefan Milutin at the council at Deževo in 1282. When the aspirations of the Nemanjić to expand south came to fruition, starting with the reign of Milutin, the fortification saw its military value decrease due to being deep in inner Serbia and isolated on a mountain peak. During the fracturing of the Serbian Empire, it was first under the realm of Vojislav Vojinović, then his nephew Nikola Altomanović, and finally the house of Branković.

With the Ottoman expansion into Serbia, many of the local population were converted to Islam and the nearby settlements were abandoned or reduced to very small villages with single houses. Under the Ottomans, the fortification's status once again grew, being the center of the local Wilayah of Jeleč. In 1455, the Jeleč wilayah had around one hundred settlements or colonies. Although wilayah is primarily an administrative center, Jeleč again had somewhat more of a military significance. At this time, the garrison in Jeleč was armed with cannons, and there are some documents that point that there was possibly a foundry in the town. The industry in the town was short-lived however.

== Characteristics ==
Jeleč is a trapezoid-shaped fortification, with meandering and curved walls 10 meters tall, built in the Serbo-Byzantine style. The fort is relatively small in size, being 45 meters in length and 35 in width. Inside the town walls there is a remain of a cistern, and the remains of windows point out to the fact that it also had living quarters. The defensiveness of Jeleč was increased by the polygonal-shaped towers in the three corners; one was most likely added by the Ottomans. The approach to the fort is barely traversable, and the trail that leads to the gates is nearly vertical. At the bottom of the main fortification, there are remains of a small town. Between the fort and the town, there were three water wells. The fortification had its own water source and is thought of being nearly impossible to take by military means.

Today, Jeleč is in a declining state, not being yet protected as an object of importance, nor being investigated enough, although there are talks for this to happen.

== See also ==
- Deževa Agreement
- Monuments of Culture of Great Importance
- Tourism in Serbia
