= Battle of Gallipoli (1312) =

Battle in Turkey

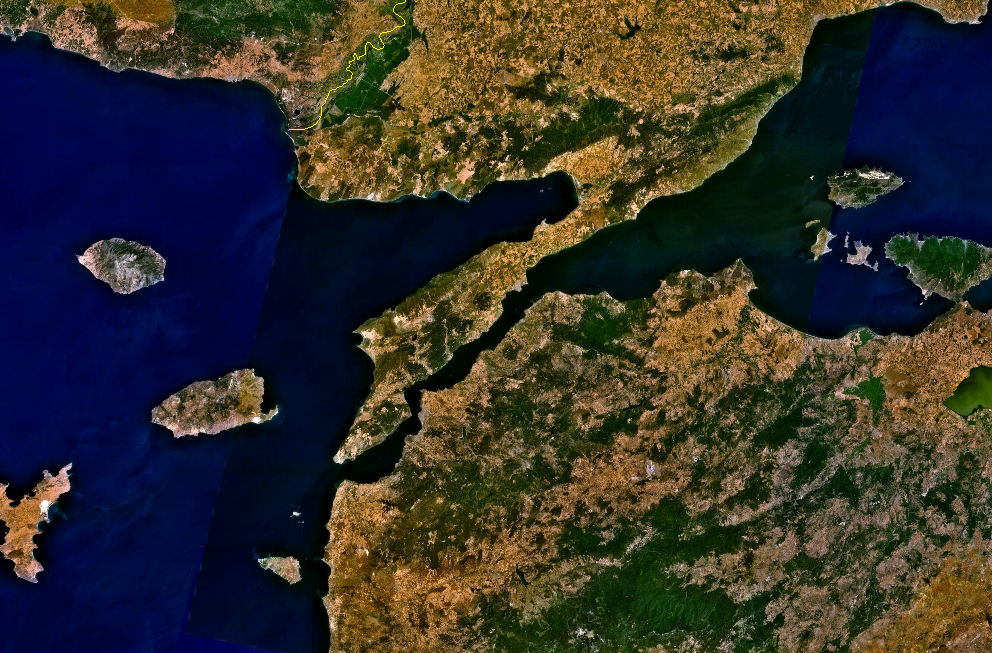
- Location of the battle
Date	1312 or 1313
Location	Gallipoli, Byzantine Empire, now modern day Turkey
Result	Byzantine victory

Belligerents
Turcopoles	Byzantine Empire; Kingdom of Serbia

Commanders and leaders
Halil Pasha †	Michael IX

Strength
under 2,000	Byzantine army and fleet 2,000 Serbian/Cuman cavalry Genoese fleet

Casualties and losses
Heavy, few survivors	Unknown

The Battle of Gallipoli was fought at the end of 1312 or in 1313, between the Byzantines and the Turcopoles led by Halil Pasha. For two years, Thrace was occupied by Halil Pasha (or Halil Edje). Earlier, Byzantine Emperor Michael IX Palaiologos had raised an army which defeated the Turcopoles, and confined them to a fortified camp in the Gallipoli peninsula. These Turcopoles numbered less than 2,000. Michael next asked assistance from his son-in-law, Serbian King Stefan Milutin, and received a 2,000-strong Serbian cavalry troop (possibly Cumans or Serbian heavy cavalry). (Note: Milutin lent Michael 2,000 cavalry troops. According to Danilo II, Archbishop of Serbs (1324–37), these were Milutin's relatives and friends, yet not impossible these cavalry consisted of Cuman warriors. According to the historian Mark Bartusis, these were possibly Cumans earlier lent to the Byzantines, while Hungarian Turkologist István Vásáry mentioned the possibility as well, correlating with later mentions of Cumans in Byzantine service. According to this view, the 2,000 Cumans arrived as allied troops sent by Milutin, then settled the lands and became reserve troops. Byzantinist Nikolaos Oikonomides mentions the cavalry as Serbian, as the first of two sent by Milutin.) Milutin had earlier subdued the Turcopoles that took refuge in Serbia. The Byzantine and Genoese ships completed the blockade, the Genoese preventing the Turcopoles from escaping by sea. The Turcopoles first made unsuccessful attempts at breaking free, but decided to surrender to the Genoese, thinking they would not be harsh. However, in the night, by mistake, many Turcopoles fell into the hands of the Byzantines, who slaughtered them and took their belongings. The Genoese executed only those Turcopoles that had many valuables, so they could not get into the hands of the Byzantines, and the rest they sold as slaves. Halil and his men were all massacred. The Serbian contingent took share in the spoils. The Turcopoles had heavy casualties, with few survivors returning to Byzantine service, though little is heard of them afterwards. The victory was made a poem by Manuel Philes. In two chrysobulls of Andronikos II Palaiologos to the Serbian Hilandar monastery, dating to October 1313 and July 1317, he showed gratitude to Stefan Milutin for his aid, as detailed in the prefaces.

== Sources ==
- Nicol, Donald M. (14 October 1993). The Last Centuries of Byzantium, 1261-1453. Cambridge University Press. p. 139. ISBN 978-0-521-43991-6.
- Bartusis, Mark C. (1 January 1997). The Late Byzantine Army: Arms and Society, 1204-1453. University of Pennsylvania Press. p. 83. ISBN 0-8122-1620-2.
- Oikonomides, Nicolas. "The Turks in Europe (1305–13) and the Serbs in Asia Minor (1313)" (PDF). The Ottoman Emirate: 159–68. Archived from the original (PDF) on 2016-03-04.
- Vásáry, István (2005). Cumans and Tatars: Oriental Military in the Pre-Ottoman Balkans, 1185–1365. Cambridge University Press. ISBN 9781139444088.
