= Zorica (princess) =

Serbian princess

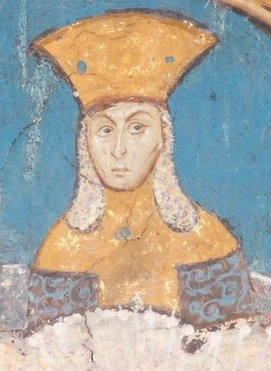
Zorica (Carica) at the Nemanjić family tree fresco, Visoki Dečani (1346).

Zorica (Serbian Cyrillic: Зорица; fl. July 1308) or Carica (Царица), (also Zaritsa, Zariza) was a Serbian princess, the daughter of King Stefan Milutin (r. 1282–1321) and Queen Elizabeth of Hungary. Her father planned to marry her to Charles, the son of Charles, Count of Valois, having signed an agreement in Serbia in July 1308, however, after Milutin's unsuccessful southward military operations and sabotage of the mission of the Papal legates sent into Serbia, Charles of Valois pulled out. She is depicted in frescos at Gračanica and Visoki Dečani.
