= Deževa Agreement =

1282 treaty in Serbia

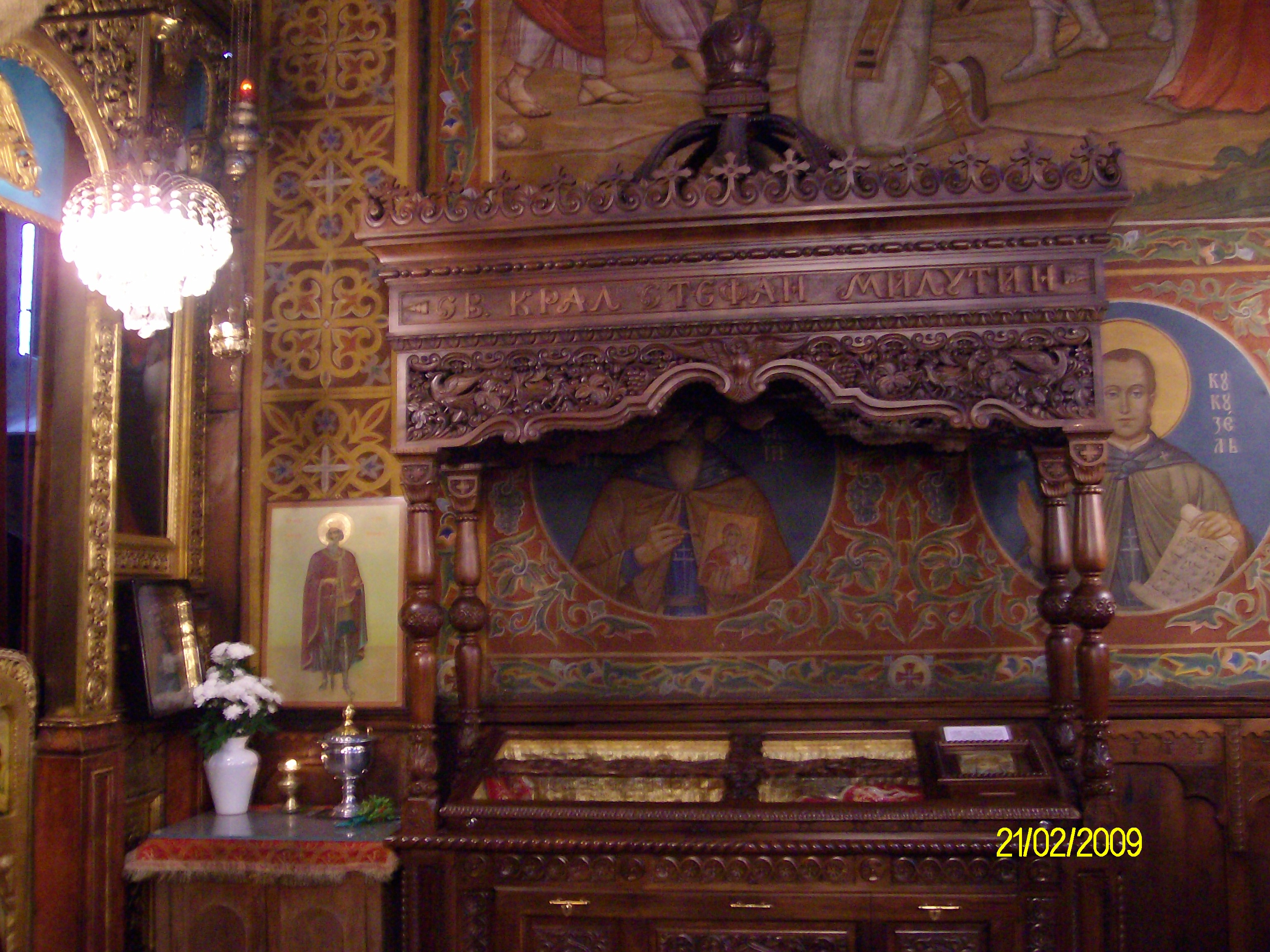
The relics of Stefan Milutin in Sofia.

The Deževa Agreement (Serbian: Дежевски споразум) concluded in 1282 in Deževa changed the policy of the medieval Kingdom of Serbia.

In 1282, King Stefan Dragutin was replaced by Stefan Milutin, his younger brother, with the royal title to revert after his death to one of Stefan Dragutin's sons. The official version of the incident is that King Dragutin's horse fell in the vicinity of Fort Jeleč, incapacitating him with a broken leg. The Serbian Archbishop Danilo II reports great confusion after the accident, and the people, facing the threat of attack from a neighbor, forced King Stephan to hand over the royal title to his brother.

As part of the agreement, King Milutin took the Bulgarian princess Anna Terter as a wife and radically changed the foreign policy, directing it to the seizure of Byzantine possessions, becoming an ally of the Second Bulgarian Empire.

A large temple dedicated to Saint Sava is being built on the site.
