= Záviš of Falkenstein =

Czech nobleman

- Born: c. 1250
- Died: 24 August 1290
- Spouses: Unnamed first wife (died before 1280); Kunigunda of Halych (m. 1280/1285; died 1285); Elizabeth of Arpad (m. 1287/1288)
- Issue: 2 sons, including John of Falkenstein
- Father: Budivoj
- Mother: Prechta

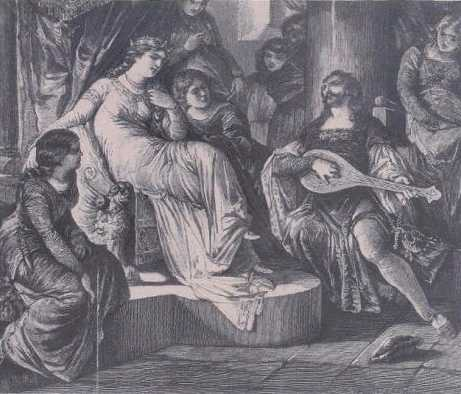
Queen Kunegunda and Záviš, 19th-century illustration

Záviš of Falkenstein (Czech: Záviš z Falkenštejna; c. 1250 – 24 August 1290), a member of the noble house of Vítkovci, was a Bohemian who became stepfather to Wenceslaus II of Bohemia, by marriage to the Dowager Queen Kunigunda of Halych. He was intertwined in political conflicts with both his stepson and, earlier, Kunigunda's first husband, Ottokar II.

== Biography ==
Záviš was a scion of the Vítkovci, lords of Krumlov. His father Budivoj (d. after 1272) had married the Austrian noblewoman Perchta of Falkenstein. He entered the service of his mother's family as burgrave of Falkenstein Castle (in present-day Hofkirchen). At some point Záviš married an unknown woman who died before 1280.

Like many other Bohemian nobles, he was concerned over the rise of the Přemyslid prince Ottokar II, son and heir of King Wenceslaus I of Bohemia, who in 1251 was installed as Austrian duke. Bohemian king from 1253, Ottokar founded the royal city of Budějovice (Budweis) and Zlatá Koruna Abbey to hinder further expansion of the Vítkovci domains; he also denied dynasty's entitlement to the Lordship of Velešín. However, his position was undermined when he entered into a fierce conflict with Count Rudolf of Habsburg, elected King of the Romans in 1273. Rudolf reclaimed the Austrian duchy and numerous other 'alienated' territories; when in 1276 he imposed an Imperial ban on Ottokar, several Bohemian nobles around Záviš took the occasion for open revolt.

The insurgents pillaged Budějovice and Zlatá Koruna; Ottokar, facing revolt, had to enter into negotiations with Rudolf. He was forced to waive all acquisitions and retired to his Bohemian and Moravian hereditary lands. Although the Přemyslid king could suppress the Bohemian uprising with decisive action and forced Záviš to flee, Rudolf also demanded the restoration of the Vítkovci estates. The struggle continued until Ottokar was finally defeated by Rudolf's forces and killed in the 1278 Battle on the Marchfeld.

Upon the king's death, the Bohemian lands were ruled by the Ascanian margrave Otto of Brandenburg, acting as regent and guardian of Ottokar's minor son Wenceslaus II. Soon, however, new tensions arose with queen dowager Kunigunda and Margrave Otto had mother and son imprisoned at Bezděz Castle. Kunigunda was able to escape to Opava, where she allied with Záviš of Falkenstein, her late husband's enemy. She appointed him burgrave of Hradec and both possibly also began an affair. In turn, the margrave removed the heir to the throne out of the country to Spandau in Brandenburg where he was arrested until 1282.

As conditions in the princeless Bohemian kingdom worsened, the local nobles urged the return of Wenceslaus II. Finally, Otto of Brandenburg retired, not without collecting a considerable ransom and the confirmation of the Ascanian possessions in Upper Lusatia. Wenceslaus was released from custody and returned to Prague in 1283.

Two years later, in 1285, Wenceslaus married Judith of Habsburg, daughter of King Rudolf. At the same time Zavis started to officially appear as husband of the Dowager Queen Kunigunda and Weneclaus's stepfather. It's unclear when exactly he and the former queen married, as various years from 1280-1285 are given in sources; their son John was born either in 1281 or 1282.

Once Otto of Brandenburg was expelled, Zavis took his place at the head of local nobles along with Bishop Tobiáš of Bechyně, gained strong influence over the young king and manned important offices with his relatives and fellows. Given the situation at the Bohemian court, Rudolf took his daughter back to Austria after the wedding ceremony. Záviš's nepotism provoked the discontent of the Bohemian nobility and also the mistrust of Rudolf of Habsburg, after Wenceslaus refused to support the succession of his brother-in-law Albert, presumably under Záviš's influence. When Kunigunda died only a few months later in September 1285, Zavis proceeded to the court of King Ladislaus IV of Hungary, whose sister Elizabeth he married in 1287.

The couple took residence at Svojanov Castle and Záviš again tried to gain influence on Bohemian politics. In turn, Rudolf of Habsburg finally guided his daughter Judith to the Prague throne and urged for measures taken against the usurper. The court requested the return of late Kunigunda's royal estates held by Záviš. When he refused he was accused of high treason and arrested in 1289. A revolt by his brothers failed and Záviš was executed on 24 August 1290 at Hluboká Castle. He was buried in the Vyšší Brod Monastery.

Záviš was survived by his third wife Elizabeth and his son from the second marriage, John, who went to become a Teutonic Knight. The fate of his second son (by Elizabeth) is unknown, but historian Małgorzata Duczmal speculates that the boy was taken by mother when she was returning to her homeland after becoming a widow.

== Marriages and children ==
Záviš was married three times. His first wife's name is unknown; she died before 1280.

Around 1280 he entered into relationship with the Dowager Queen of Bohemia Kunigunda of Halych, whom he married at unknown date between 1280 and her death on 9 September 1285. They had one child:

- John (born 1281/1282, died after 1337), a Teutonic Knight.

In 1287 or 1288 Záviš married Elizabeth of Hungary, with whom he had another child:

- A son (born 1288).

== In art ==
He became the subject of Josef Richard Rozkošný's opera Záviš z Falkenštejna in 1877.
