= Deževa =

Coordinates: 43°12′N 20°28′E

- Village (Selo)
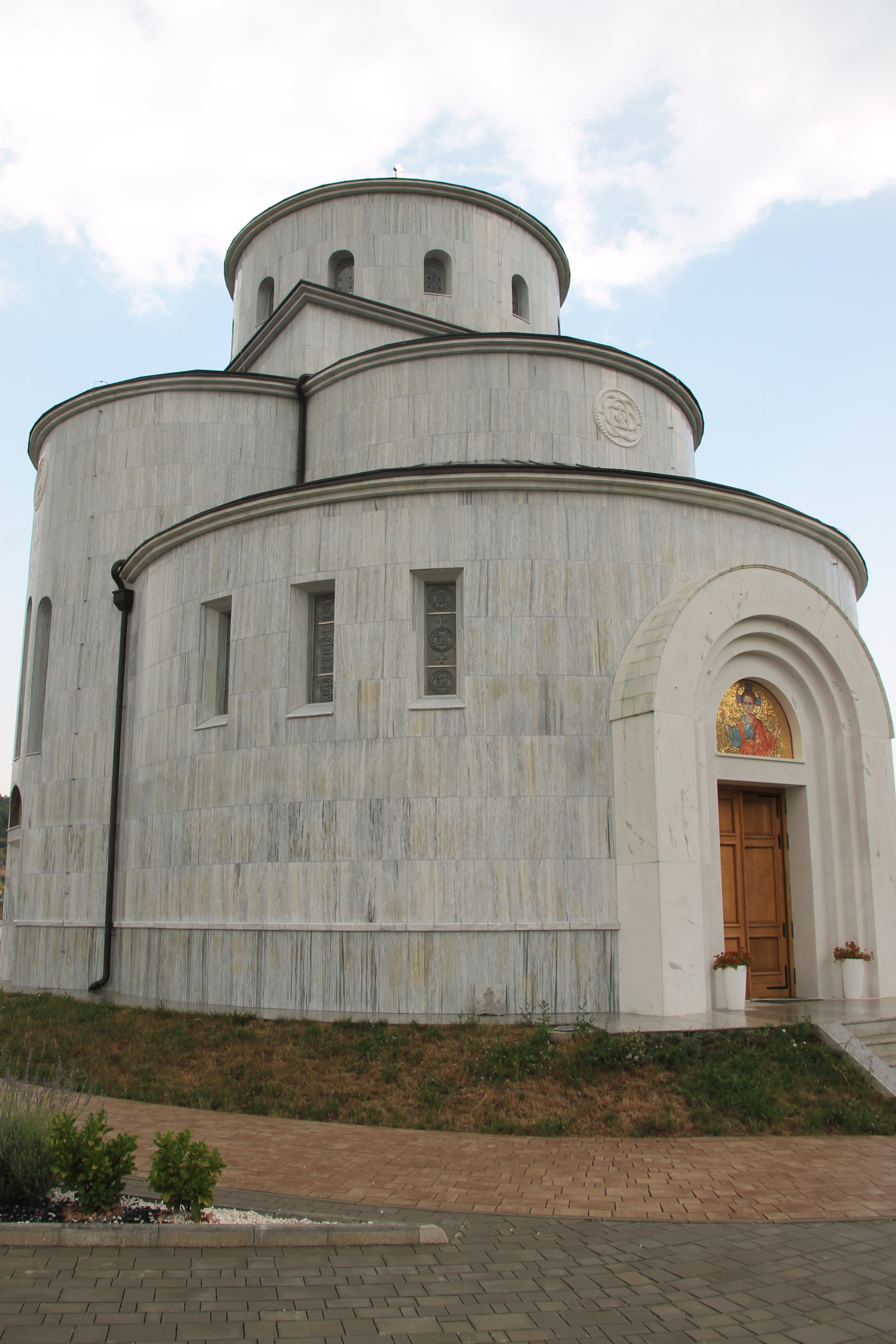
- Church of Saint Sava
- Interactive map of Deževa
- Country: Serbia
- Municipality: Novi Pazar
- Time zone: UTC+1 (CET)
  - Summer (DST): UTC+2 (CEST)

Deževa (Serbian: Дежева), historically Deževo (Дежево) is a village situated in Novi Pazar municipality in Serbia.

== Medieval legacy ==
Deževo was a medieval settlement, part of the Ras/Raška župa. It is the location of the signing of the Deževa Agreement (1282) regarding succession of the Serbian throne of the Nemanjić, and external politics.
