= Helena Doukaina Angelina =

- Queen consort of Serbia
- Born: Ἑλένη Δούκαινα Άγγελίνα; 13. century Thessalia
- Spouse: Stefan Milutin
- Issue: Stefan Konstantin; Stefan Dečanski
- House: Komnenos Doukas
- Father: John I Doukas of Thessaly
- Mother: Hypomone

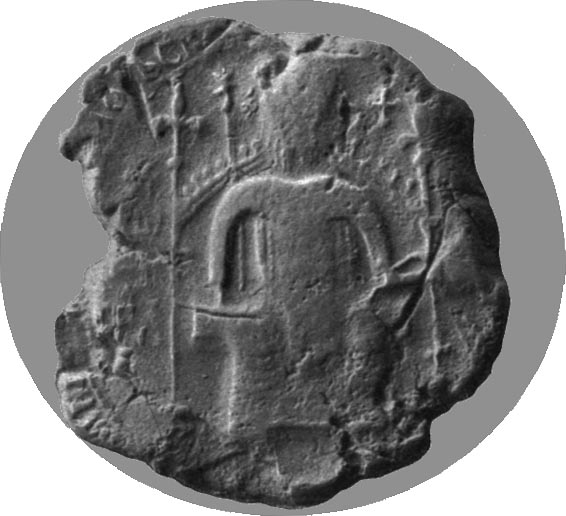
Seal of Serbian King Stefan Milutin, dated between 1305 and 1307

Helena Doukaina Angelina (Greek: Ἑλένη Δούκαινα Άγγελίνα, Helene Doukaina Angelina; Serbian: Jelena Duka Anđel) was a Greek noblewoman of Thessaly and Queen-consort of medieval Serbia.

Her parents were John I Doukas of Thessaly and his wife Hypomone (a daughter of the Thessalian Vlach chieftain Taronas). In ca. 1273/76, Helena married Serbian king Stefan Milutin (r. 1282–1321), but Milutin abandoned her in ca. 1283. It is possible that their sons were Kings Stefan Konstantin and Stefan Dečanski. It seems Helena then returned to Greece.

== Sources ==
- Polemis, Demetrios I. (1968). The Doukai: A Contribution to Byzantine Prosopography. London: The Athlone Press.
- Trapp, Erich; Beyer, Hans-Veit; Walther, Rainer; Sturm-Schnabl, Katja; Kislinger, Ewald; Leontiadis, Ioannis; Kaplaneres, Sokrates (1976–1996). Prosopographisches Lexikon der Palaiologenzeit (in German). Vienna: Verlag der Österreichischen Akademie der Wissenschaften. ISBN 3-7001-3003-1.
