= Svetislav Mandić =

- Born: 8 March 1921; Mostar, Kingdom of Serbs, Croats and Slovenes
- Died: 4 October 2003 (aged 82); Belgrade, Serbia and Montenegro
- Education: Academy of Fine Arts, Belgrade
- Occupations: Historian, copier, fresco conserver, poet, and painter
- Years active: 1940s–2003

Svetislav Mandić (Serbian Cyrillic: Светислав Мандић; 8 March 1921 – 4 October 2003) was a Yugoslav and Serbian historian, copier, fresco conserver, poet and painter.

== Life ==
He was born on March 8, 1921, in Mostar, Kingdom of Yugoslavia (now Bosnia and Herzegovina). He finished the gymnasium in his town in 1939, and then finished the Academy of Fine Arts in capital Belgrade in 1950. He started with poetry in his gymnasium days, and as a student published poems in various papers and newspapers. In his adult years he began his work on cultural monuments of the history of the Serbs and he published many works on that theme, due to which he was awarded the Order of St. Sava class I.

== Books ==
- "Dvojica", pesme (zajedno sa Velimirom Kovačevićem, Mostar 1940),
- "Kad mlidijah živeti", mladalačka elegija ("Novo pokolenje", Beograd 1952),
- "Milosno doba", pesme ("Prosveta", Beograd 1960),
- "The Virgin's Church at Studenica" (1966)
- "Drevnik", zapisi konzervatora ("Slovo ljubve", Beograd 1975),
- "Crte i reze", fragmenti starog imenika ("Slovo ljubve", Beograd 1981),
- "Rozeta na Resavi", pletenije slovesa o Ravanici i Manasiji ("Bagdala", Kruševac 1986),
- "Velika gospoda sve srpske zemlje" i drugi prosopografski prilozi ("Srpska književna zadruga", Beograd 1986),
- "Carski čin Stefana Nemanje", činjenice i pretpostavke o srpskom srednjovekovlju ("Srpska književna zadruga", Beograd 1990),
- "Pesme", izbor ("Veselin Maslesa", Sarajevo 1990),
- "Zvezdara i druge pesme", ("Srpska književna zadruga", Beograd 1995),
