= Ana Terter =

Bulgarian princess and Queen consort of Serbia

Ana Анна Ана

Queen consort of Serbia
- Tenure: 1284–1299
- Spouses: Stefan Milutin; Demetrios Koutroules
- Issue: Andronikos Palaiologos Angelos; Constantine Palaiologos Angelos; Wife of Alexios Raoul
- House: Terter; Nemanjić (first marriage); Komnenodoukas dynasty (second marriage)
- Father: George I of Bulgaria
- Mother: Maria or Kira Maria?

Ana Terter (Serbian and Bulgarian Cyrillic: Ана Тертер; died after 1304) was the Queen consort of Serbia from 1284 to 1299. She was the fourth wife of the Serbian King Stefan Milutin, their marriage having been arranged following the Deževa Agreement of 1282.

Ana Terter and King Stefan Milutin likely had no children. In 1299, Stefan Uroš II Milutin divorced Ana in order to marry his fifth wife, the Byzantine princess Simonida.

In her second marriage, with Byzantine nobleman Demetrios Koutroules, she had several children.

== Origin ==
According to Bulgarian historiography, Anna Terter was the daughter of George I of Bulgaria.

== Sources ==
- Krastev, Krasimir. "Съдбата на българската царкиня Анна Тертер" - Тангра. Сборник в чест на 70-годишнината на акад. Васил Гюзелев. С.: СУ, 2006, 649-657
- Pavlov, Plamen."Търновските царици". В.Т.:ДАР-РХ, 2006.

Royal titles
Preceded by Elizabeth of Hungary	Queen consort of Serbia; 1284–1299	Succeeded by Simonida
