= Simonida =

Simonida Nemanjić Симонида Немањић
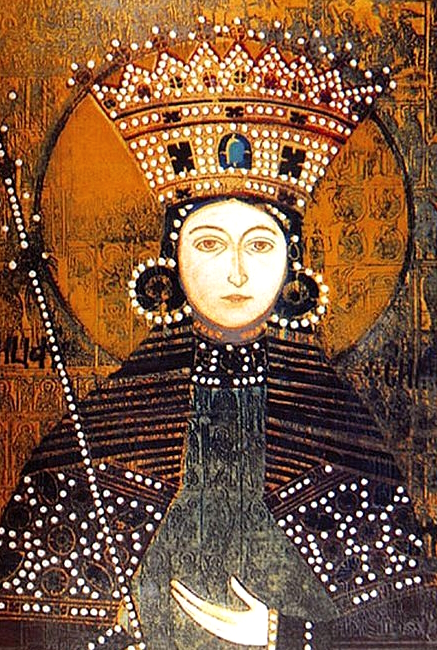
- Queen Simonida of Serbia, a fresco from Gračanica monastery

Queen consort of Serbia
- Tenure: 1299–1321
- Born: c. 1294; Constantinople, Byzantine Empire
- Died: after 1345; Constantinople
- Spouse: King Stefan Milutin
- Dynasty: Nemanjić (by marriage); Palaiologos
- Father: Emperor Andronikos II Palaiologos
- Mother: Irene of Montferrat

Simonida Nemanjić (Serbian Cyrillic: Симонида Немањић; c. 1294 – after 1336), born Simonis Palaiologina (Greek: Σιμωνίς Παλαιολογίνα, sr. Симонида Палеолог, Simonida Paleolog), was a Byzantine princess and queen consort of the Kingdom of Serbia as the fifth wife of Serbian king Stefan Milutin (r. 1282–1321). She was a daughter of the Byzantine Emperor Andronikos II Palaiologos (r. 1282–1328) and Irene of Montferrat. In Medieval Serbia Simonida is best remembered as a patron of the Arts, Music and Literature.

== Life ==
Simonida was born in Constantinople c. 1294. In 1298, as a result of a Byzantine defeat, her father Emperor Andronikos II promised a marriage alliance to the Serbian ruler Stefan Milutin. Initially, Andronikos II intended to wed his sister Eudokia, the empress-dowager of Trebizond, but after she refused, his very young daughter Simonida was proposed instead. Church circles in Constantinople opposed the marriage, but the emperor was determined to push the deal through, and in late 1298 he sent his trusted minister Theodore Metochites to Serbia to conduct the negotiations. On his part, Milutin too was eager to accept, and even divorced his fourth wife, Ana Terter, the daughter of the Bulgarian tsar George Terter. The marriage was celebrated in Thessalonica in spring 1299, and the couple departed for Serbia in April.

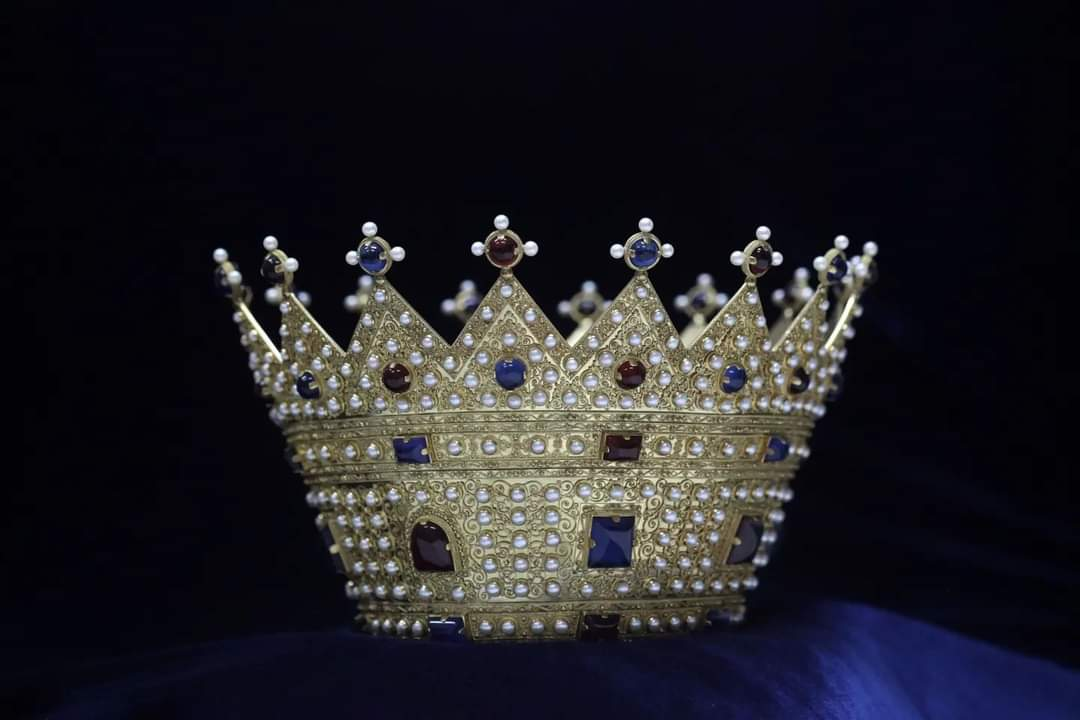
Reconstructed crown of Queen Simonida.

== Legacy ==
Her beauty was well known, and she was known as a figure of purity and beauty in Serbian tradition. A fresco of her in Gračanica monastery is regarded as one of the most valuable frescoes in Serbian art. Unfortunately, the fresco is damaged, so that the area round Simonida's eyes is partly obscured.

She brought a large entourage to Serbia, and with her arrival, Serbia received a massive injection of Byzantine culture. Byzantine-style court ceremonials and dress were adopted, Byzantine functional and honorary titles appeared, court offices were renamed, and Byzantine administrative, fiscal and legal institutions were copied. Byzantinization was further expanded by Serbia's newly won populous Greek-speaking regions, in which Milutin retained all former Byzantine political, social and cultural activities. Strangely enough, none of this would have happened due to a near-death experience in 1303 during a small festival being held in Ras. A maid had nearly killed her by jumping off a known balcony but had failed to do so.

Milan Rakić wrote a lyric poem about her named Simonida, and Milutin Bojić wrote a psychological drama called Kraljeva Jesen ("King's autumn") about her. Asteroid 1675 Simonida discovered by Serbian astronomer Milorad B. Protić was named after her.

== See also ==
- Kassia
- Anna Komnene
- Jefimija
- Princess Milica of Serbia
- Saint Angelina of Serbia
- Mara Branković
- Olivera Despina
- Jelena Balšić
- Saint Helen of Serbia
- Maria Angelina Doukaina Palaiologina
- Nicodemus of Tismana

Royal titles
Preceded by Ana Terter	Queen consort of Serbia; 1299–1321	Succeeded by Theodora Smilets
