= List of Serbian rebellions =

The following is a list of rebellions and revolutions that were started by or that included Serbs.

== Middle ages ==
From the start of the Grand Principality of Serbia to the Fall of the Serbian Despotate.

- Serb Uprising (927)
- Doclean Serb Uprising (1042/1043)
- Slav Uprising in Pomoravlje

== Partitioned Serbia ==
From 1459 to the beginning of the Serbian Revolution in 1804.

- Jovan Nenad's Uprising
- Uprising in Banat
- Serb uprising of 1596–1597
- Stefan Osmokruhović's revolt
- Kuridža's Rebellion
- Uprising in Vučitrn
- Serb uprising of 1737–1739
- Petar Ljubojević's rebellion
- Koča's Frontier rebellion

== Modern Period ==
From the start of the Serbian Revolution to the start of World War I

- First Serbian Uprising
- Tican's rebellion
- Kruščica rebellion
- Jančić's Rebellion
- Hadži Prodan's rebellion
- Second Serbian Uprising
- Niš conspiracy (1821)
- Priest Jovica's Rebellion
- Pirot rebellion
- Belogradchik rebellion (1836)
- Niš rebellion (1841)
- Serb uprising of 1848–1849
- Pecija's First Revolt
- Herzegovina uprising (1852–1862)
- Krivošije uprising (1869)
- Herzegovina uprising (1875–1877)
- Kumanovo uprising
- Brsjak revolt
- 1882 Herzegovina uprising
- Serbian Action in Macedonia (as a part of the wider Macedonian Struggle)
- Timok Rebellion

== World Wars and the Interwar Period ==
From the start of the Serbian campaign to the end of World War II in Yugoslavia

- Toplica Uprising
- Christmas Uprising
- May 1941 Sanski Most revolt
- June 1941 uprising in eastern Herzegovina
- Drvar uprising
- Srb uprising
- Uprising in Serbia (1941)
- Uprising in Montenegro (1941)

== Cold War ==
- Post war Chetnik insurgency in Yugoslavia
- Log Revolution

== See also ==
- List of wars involving Serbia
- List of wars involving Serbia in the Middle Ages
