= List of wars involving Serbia =

The following is a list of wars involving Serbia in the Middle Ages as well as late modern period and contemporary history.

The list gives the name, the date, combatants, and the result of these conflicts following this legend:

Serbian victory
Serbian defeat
Result of civil or internal conflict
Another result (e.g. a treaty or peace without a clear result, status quo ante bellum, result of civil or internal conflict, result unknown or indecisive)
Ongoing conflict

== Middle Ages ==
Conflict	Combatant 1	Combatant 2	Results
Bulgarian–Serbian wars (818–1330 AD)	Serbia: Principality of Serbia; Duklja; Kingdom of Serbia	Bulgaria: First Bulgarian Empire; Second Bulgarian Empire	Inconclusive: Both states had numerous territorial changes.
Bulgarian-Serbian War (839–42); Part of the Bulgarian–Serbian wars	Serbian Principality	First Bulgarian Empire	Serbian victory
Bulgarian-Serbian War (853); Part of the Bulgarian–Serbian wars	Serbian Principality	First Bulgarian Empire	Serbian victory
Bulgarian–Serbian wars of 917–924 Part of the Bulgarian–Serbian wars	Principality of Serbia; Byzantine Empire	Bulgarian Empire	Bulgarian victory: Serbia is annexed by Bulgaria
Conquest of Bari	Frankish Empire; Supported by: Principality of Benevento; Principality of Salerno; Principality of Capua; Duchy of Croatia (Note: Both the Frankish and Byzantine empires claimed authority over the Croats.); Byzantine Empire; Kanalites; Serbia; Travunia; Zachlumia	Emirate of Bari; Supported by: Aghlabid dynasty; Emirate of Taranto	Frankish victory: Fall of the Emirate of Bari
Serb Uprising (927)	Principality of Serbia; Supported by: Byzantine Empire	Bulgarian Empire	Victory Časlav takes possession of the country after the uprising and submits suzereinity to the Byzantines
Magyar-Serb conflict (c. early 9th century or c. 950/960); Part of the Hungarian invasions of Europe	Serbian Principality	Magyar tribes	Inconclusive: Battle of Drina: Serbian victory; Battle of Syrmia: Magyar victory
Serb Uprising (1042/1043)	Duklja	Byzantine Empire	Decisive Doclean Serb victory: Stefan Vojislav asserts his state's independence from Byzantium
Byzantine-Norman wars (1040–1189)	Normans; Kingdom of Sicily (after 1130); Apulia and Calabria County of Sicily Duchy of Naples: Lombard duchies; Papal States; Duchy of Benevento; Principality of Antioch; Duklja; Rascia; Kingdom of Croatia	Byzantine Empire; Republic of Venice; Holy Roman Empire	Indecisive: Norman conquest of Apulia, Calabria and the Ionian Islands.; Norman invasion of the Balkans defeated
Byzantine–Serbian War (1090–1095) (1090–1095); Part of the Byzantine–Serbian wars	Grand Principality of Serbia	Byzantine Empire: Theme of Dyrrhachion	Serbian military victory: Consecutive attacks and plunder of the Byzantine territory and defeats of their armies; Peace treaty; Several Serbian nobles taken hostage; Cessation of hostilities between Serbia and Byzantium until 1106, when Vukan defeated the army of John Komnenos and reached a truce again with Alexios I Komnenos; Southern Kosovo temporarily gained by Serbia
Battle of Zvečan (1094); Part of the Byzantine–Serbian War (1090–1095)	Grand Principality of Serbia	Byzantine Empire	Serbian victory
Byzantine–Hungarian War (1127–29)	Hungary; Serbia	Byzantine Empire	Byzantine victory
Battle of Myriokephalon (1176); Part of the Byzantine–Seljuq wars	Byzantine Empire; Hungary; Principality of Antioch; Grand Principality of Serbia	Sultanate of Rum	Seljuk victory: Military balance maintained
Emeric's Balkan campaign (1200–1203); Part of the Fourth Crusade	Grand Principality of Serbia Bulgarian Empire (1203)	Kingdom of Hungary; Valkan's Clique (as Hungarian vassal); Papal States	Emeric's Victories: Emeric gains suzereinity over Serbia and occupies a couple of Bulgarian cities which he in turn gives to his vassal Valkan; Serbo-Hungarian armies are later pushed out of Niš by Bulgarian forces
Hungarian invasion of Serbia(1237) Part of the Crusade against Bogumils	Grand Principality of Serbia Banate of Bosnia Temporary support: Republic of Ragusa	Kingdom of Hungary Golden Horde; Chagatai Khanate	Victory: During Colomans failed campaign in Bosnia, he penetrated Toljen II's land in Serbia, he was kicked out after a brief consultation; This event lead to an alliance between Serbia and Split under Domald
Mongol invasion of Bulgaria and Serbia (1242–1243); Part of the Mongol invasion of Europe: Invasion of Serbia; Invasion of Bulgaria	Second Bulgarian Empire; Serbian Kingdom	Mongol Empire	Mongol victory
Serbian conflict with the Nogai Horde (1280s–1290s)	Kingdom of Serbia; Kingdom of Syrmia; Kingdom of Hungary	Nogai Horde; Golden Horde	Serbian victory: Kingdom of Syrmia annexes Braničevo and Kučevo and Kingdom of Serbia captures Shishman's territory
Epirote–Nicaean conflict (1257–1259)	Despotate of Epirus; Kingdom of Serbia	Empire of Nicaea	Nicaean victory: Subsequent restoration of Byzantine Empire
Serbian-Crusader Conflict	Byzantine Empire; Kingdom of Serbia	Turcopoles	Byzantine victory
Serbian-Anjou War (1318–1320)	Kingdom of Serbia	Kingdom of Hungary: Mladen II Šubić; Lordship of Durazzo Muzaka Family (1318); Supported by Pope John XXII	Partial Victory: Stefan Milutin crushes the Albanian Revolt without much difficulty; Charles I's troops capture Belgrade and Mačva region; Further incursion into central Serbia prevented; John XXII calls (due to the mass-persecution against the Catholic Church in Serbia) for a full-fledged crusade against Serbia which never came; Stefan Milutin is named the Rascian heretic by the Pope
War of Hum (1326–1329)	Kingdom of Serbia	Banate of Bosnia; Republic of Ragusa	Bosnian victory: Bosnia captures Zahumlje
Bulgarian-Serbian War (1330); Part of the Bulgarian–Serbian wars	Kingdom of Serbia; Supported by: Andronikos II Palaiologos (Byzantine Empire) and the Catalan Company	Bulgarian Empire; Supported by: Wallachia; Andronikos III Palaiologos (Byzantine Empire)	Serbian victory
Byzantine civil war of 1341–1347 (1342–1347); Part of the Byzantine civil wars, the Byzantine–Serbian wars and the Byzantine–Turkish wars	(Byzantine Empire) John V Palaiologos; Regents: (Byzantine Empire) Anna of Savoy (Byzantine Empire) John XIV Kalekas (Byzantine Empire) Alexios Apokaukos; Allies: Zealots of Thessalonica (Serbian Empire) Serbia (1343–1347); Bulgaria; Principality of Karvuna	(Byzantine Empire) John VI Kantakouzenos; Allies: (Serbian Empire) Serbia (1342–1343); Beylik of Aydin (1342/3–1345) (Ottoman Empire) Ottoman beylik (1345–1347); Beylik of Saruhan; Principality of Albania; Principality of Muzaka	Kantakouzenos victory: Serbia gained Macedonia and Albania, and soon after Epirus and Thessaly, establishing the Serbian Empire. *Bulgaria gains northern Thrace.
Serbian Invasion of Albania (1342–1345); Part of the Byzantine civil war of 1341-1347	Kingdom of Serbia; Bulgarian Empire; Principality of Karvuna; Supported by: John V Palaiologos	John VI Kantakouzenos: Topia family; Muzaka family; Beylik of Aydin; Ottoman Beylik Zealots of Thessalonica	Victory: All of Albania, with the exception of Anjou-controlled Dyrrachium, falls to Serbia whose patriarchal throne is solidified in 1346 in the Peć Monastery; The Serbian Orthodox Church becomes independent from Constantinople; Thessaly and Epirus are later occupied by Serbia; The Serbian Empire is established and Stefan Dušan is crowned Emperor of Serbs and Greeks; Beginning of the Albanian Resistance against Serbia
Serbian-Ottoman War (1352); Part of the Byzantine civil war of 1352–1357	John V Palaiologos; Serbian Empire; Bulgarian Empire	John VI Kantakouzenos; Ottoman Beylik	Ottoman victory: Kantakouzenos retains power, Palaiologos exiled
Serbian Civil War (1356–1359) Part of the Fall of the Serbian Empire	Serbian Empire	Empire of Thessaly (until 1359); Losha Clan; Shpata Family Despotate of Epir: Turkish mercenaries; Byzantine Empire (until 1357)	Loyalist Victory: Simeon Uroš fails to become the new Tsar of Serbia; Nikephoros II Orsini is beaten by Arbanas tribesmen
The Feudal Wars (1356–1373)	Serbian Empire; Moravian Serbia; District of Branković; Realm of Altomanović (until 1369) Anti-Altomanović Coalition: Moravian Serbia; Banate of Bosnia; Lordship of Zeta; Kingdom of Hungary: Garai Family; Republic of Ragusa	Lordship of Prilep (1369) Realm of Altomanović (after 1369) Principality of Velbazhd Battle of Maritsa: Ottoman Empire	Inconclusive: The Serbian Army is fragmented at the Battle of Maritsa; Further anarchy; Feudal fragmentation
Battle of Kosovo (1389); Part of the Ottoman wars in Europe and the Serbian–Ottoman wars	Moravian Serbia; Supported by: District of Branković; Kingdom of Bosnia; Principality of Muzaka; Jonima Family	Ottoman Empire; Supported by: Beylik of Isfendiyar	Inconclusive
Crusade of Nicopolis (1396); Part of the Ottoman wars in Europe and the Crusades	Ottoman Empire; Moravian Serbia	Crusade: Kingdom of Hungary; Holy Roman Empire; Kingdom of France; Duchy of Burgundy; Kingdom of Croatia; Principality of Wallachia; Knights Hospitaller; Republic of Venice; Republic of Genoa; Bulgarian Empire; Teutonic Knights; Byzantine Empire; County of Cilli; District of Branković	Ottoman victory: Crusader failure to capture Nicopolis from the Ottomans
Ottoman-Timurid War 1399–1402: Sack of Sebaste; Siege of Ankara; Battle of Ankara	Ottoman Empire: Anatolian beyliks; Black Tatars; Albanian principalities Moravian Serbia; District of Branković; Wallachia; Co-belligerent: Mamluks; Kingdom of Georgia; Knights Hospitaller	Timurid Empire: Anatolian beyliks; Aq Qoyunlu; Germiyanids	Defeat: Anatolian Beyliks got independence.; Bayezid I is captured by Timur and dies in captivity, leaving the Ottoman Empire without a sultan; Ottoman Interregnum begins; Ottoman Empire on the brink of collapse; Timurid conquests and invasions ends.
Ottoman Interregnum (1402–1413)	Mehmed's forces Serbian Despotate; Dulkadirids	İsa's forces Süleyman's forces Musa's forces Wallachia	Mehmed victory: Reunification of the Ottoman state
Second Scutari War (1419–23)	Zeta (until 1421); Serbian Despotate (after 1421); Albanian nobility: Dukagjini family; Kastrioti family; Humoj family; Zaharia family	Republic of Venice	Inconclusive, See aftermath: Venice captured Ulcinj, Grbalj, and territory of Paštrovići, with Kotor deciding to accept Venetian suzerainty; Serbian Despotate captured Drivast and returned its suzerainty over Bar, Budva, and Luštica
Despotate-Ottoman Wars (1425–1459) Part of the Ottoman Invasions of Serbia and Hungarian–Ottoman Wars: War of the South Danube (1420–1432); Hungarian–Ottoman War (1437–1442); Battle of Niš; Battle of Leskovac; Siege of Belgrade	Serbian Despotate; Kingdom of Hungary: Kingdom of Poland; Kingdom of Croatia; Taborite mercenaries Grand Duchy of Lithuania; Kingdom of Bosnia (after 1425); Wallachia (briefly); Crusade of Varna: Papal States; Bulgarian rebels Teutonic Knights; Naval support: Duchy of Burgundy; Republic of Ragusa; Republic of Venice (temporary); Military support: League of Lezhë (temporary) Holy Roman Empire: Kingdom of Bohemia	Ottoman Empire: Wallachia; Crimean Khanate; Supported by: Republic of Venice; Principality of Moldavia Principality of Kastrioti; Hunyadi's Army	Eventual Defeat: The Serbian Despotate officially falls in Smederevo and is later reinstated multiple times as a rump-state as a buffer against Ottoman advance; About 200,000 immigrate to Hungarian Srem until its partition; Beginning of Serbian guerilla warfare against the Ottoman Empire

== Partitioned Serbia ==
Conflict	Combatant 1	Combatant 2	Results
Jovan Nenad's uprising (1526–1527); Part of the Hungarian campaign of 1527–1528	Serbian Empire of Jovan Nenad	Hungarian Kingdom of House Szapolyai; Ottoman Empire	Mixed results: Early Serbian success; Turks are expelled from Bačka; Jovan Nenad and his army capture Banat, Bačka and most of Srem; Establishment of Serbian Empire of Jovan Nenad; Serbian Empire of Jovan Nenad is abolished after Nenad's death
Uprising in Banat (1594); Part of the Long Turkish War and the Serbian–Ottoman wars	Serb rebels Supported by: Archduchy of Austria	Ottoman Empire	Ottoman victory
Serb uprising in Herzegovina (1596–1597) Part of the Long Turkish War	Hajduks: Bjelopavlići; Drobnjaci; Nikšići; Pivljani	Ottoman Empire: Eyalet of Karadağ	Defeat: Exodus of Herzegovinians and migration to Bay of Kotor and Dalmatia
Bocskai's War of Independence (1604–1606) Part of the Long Turkish War and European wars of religion	Loyalists: Kingdom of Croatia; Holy Roman Empire: Crown of Bohemia; Archduchy of Austria; Spanish Empire; Zaporozhian Host Serbian, Wallonian, Italian, German and Romanian mercenaries	Revolutionaries: Principality of Transylvania; Moldavia Hungarian, Slovak, Rusyn, Polish and Székely mercenaries Ottoman Empire: Crimean Khanate	Peace treaty: Treaty of Vienna (1606)
Cretan War (1645–1669)	Republic of Venice: Hajduks; Papal States; Kingdom of France; Naval Support: Knights of Malta; Greek uprisings: Greek Revolutionaries: Maniots	Ottoman Empire: Eyalet of Tripoli; Eyalet of Tunis; Eyalet of Algiers	Defeat: Ottomans conquer Crete; Venetian gains in Dalmatia
Great Turkish War (1683–1699)	Holy Roman Empire: Serbian Militia; Kingdom of Hungary; Republic of Venice; Montenegro	Ottoman Empire: Crimean Khanate; Kuruc	Victory: Partial Liberation of Serbia; Ottoman decline in Europe
Morean War (1684–1699); Part of the Great Turkish war and Croatian-Slavonian-Dalmatian theater in the Great Turkish War	Republic of Venice: Hajduks and Morlachs; Papal States; Duchy of Savoy; Order of Saint Stephen; Naval Support: Knights of Malta; Greek uprisings: Greek Revolutionaries: Maniots; Military support: Holy Roman Empire: Croatian Military Frontier; Slavonian Military Frontier; Montenegro	Ottoman Empire: Elayet of Bosnia; Eyalet of Egypt; Eyalet of Tripoli; Eyalet of Tunis; Eyalet of Algiers; Maniots	Venetian and Holy League victory: Liberation of Slavonia and Lika and part of the Pounje from the Ottomans; Morea ceded to Venice; Venetian gains in inland Dalmatia; Ottomans pushed out of Central Europe
Rákóczi's War of Independence	Holy Roman Empire: Austria; Royalists; Krajinars; Danish Auxiliary Corps	Kuruc Supported by: Polish and Ruthenian mercenaries Kingdom of France; Ottoman Empire	Victory: Treaty of Szatmár; Serbs plunder and loot the Great Hungarian Plain
War of Sinj (1714–1718); Part of the Austro-Turkish War (1716-1718) and Ottoman-Portuguese confrontations	Holy League: Republic of Venice: Hajduks; Himariotes; Holy Roman Empire; Kingdom of Portugal; Knights of Malta; Papal States	Ottoman Empire: Eyalet of Tripoli	Defeat: Ottomans defeat Venice, but fail to stop Prince Eugene of Savoy in the battle of Petrovaradin; Morea ceded back to the Ottomans; Treaty of Passarowitz
Austro-Turkish War (1716–1718)	(Habsburg monarchy) Austria: Serbian Militia (Note: As well as Serbian garrison troops during the Battle of Petrovaradin); Electorate of Bavaria	Ottoman Empire: Crimean Khanate	Victory: Treaty of Passarowitz; Most of Serbia liberated
Austro-Turkish War (1737–1739)	(Habsburg monarchy) Austria: Kingdom of Serbia	Ottoman Empire	Inconclusive: Austrian Military Victory; Ottoman Political Victory; Treaty of Belgrade
Austro-Turkish War (1788–1791)	(Holy Roman Empire) Habsburg monarchy: Koča's frontier; Russian Empire: Black Sea Cossacks; Montenegro	Ottoman Empire: Danubian Sich; Budjak Horde; Nekrasov Cossacks; Sheikh Mansur Movement	Austrian Victory: Treaty of Sistova

== Modern period ==
Conflict	Combatant 1	Combatant 2	Results
Uprising against the Dahije (1804)	Serbia	Dahije	Victory: Outbreak of First Serbian Uprising
First Serbian Uprising (1804–1813); Part of the Serbian Revolution	Serbia Supported by: Russia (1807–12)	Dahijas (1804) Ottoman Empire (from 1805): Bosnia Eyalet; Pashalik of Scutari; Pashalik of Yanina; Supported by: France	Defeat: Treaty of Bucharest; Abolishment of Serbian rebel government; Cause of the Second Serbian uprising
Russo-Turkish War (1806–1812); Part of the Serbian Revolution and Russo-Turkish Wars	Russian Empire Moldavia; Wallachia; Revolutionary Serbia; Prince-Bishopric of Montenegro (1806–12)	Ottoman Empire	Victory: Treaty of Bucharest
Hadži-Prodan's rebellion (1814)	(Serbia) Serb rebels	Ottoman Empire	Defeat: The Ottomans increase their persecution of Serbs.; The outbreak of the Second Serbian Uprising.
Second Serbian Uprising (1815–1817); Part of the Serbian Revolution	(Principality of Serbia) Serbian rebels	Ottoman Empire	Victory: Establishment of the autonomous Principality of Serbia; Ottoman Empire loses control over the Sanjak of Smederevo
Niš Rebellion (1821)	(Serbia) Serb rebels	Ottoman Empire	Defeat: Rebellion suppressed by the Ottomans. Serbian civilians massacred.
Serbian Involvement in the Greek Revolution; Part of the Greek War of Independence	Greek Revolutionaries: Filiki Eteria; Serbian Revolutionaries; Montenegrin Revolutionaries; After 1821: First Hellenic Republic: Serbian Philhellens; Military Support: Russian Empire; Kingdom of France; United Kingdom	Ottoman Empire: Eyalet of Egypt; Eyalet of Tripoli; Eyalet of Tunis; Eyalet of Algiers; Danubian Sich	Greek Victory: Greek Independence achieved; Serbo-Montenegrin volunteers return home, some stay and are Hellenized
Serb uprising (1848–1849); Part of the Revolutions of 1848 in the Austrian Empire	Serbian Vojvodina: Serb volunteers from Principality of Serbia; Supported by: Austrian Empire: Kingdom of Croatia	Kingdom of Hungary (until 14 April 1849); Hungarian State (after 14 April 1849): Various revolutionary minorities	Victory: Establishment of the autonomous Serbian Voivodeship; Most demands from the May Assembly met
Herzegovina uprising (1875–1877); Part of the Great Eastern Crisis	Serb rebels Supported by: Serbia; Montenegro	Ottoman Empire	Defeat: Great Eastern Crisis; Serbian–Ottoman Wars; Montenegrin–Ottoman War
First Serbian-Ottoman War (1876–1877); Part of the Great Eastern Crisis	Serbia; Montenegro; (Russia) Russian Volunteers; Bulgarian Volunteers	Ottoman Empire: Egypt	Indecisive: Serbian offensive repulsed; Ottoman offensive stopped; British public opinion turns against the Ottomans; Russian-mediated truce; Status quo ante bellum
Second Serbian–Ottoman War (1877–1878); Part of the Great Eastern Crisis and the Russo-Turkish War (1877–78)	Serbia; Russia	Ottoman Empire Albanian volunteers	Victory: De jure independence of Serbia; Tens of thousands of Turkish, Jewish and Albanian civilians expelled; Treaty of San Stefano; Treaty of Berlin
Russo-Turkish War (1877–1878)	Russian Empire: Guard of Finland; Principality of Romania; Principality of Serbia; Principality of Montenegro; Bulgarian Legion; Serbian rebels	Ottoman Empire: Egypt; (Poland) Polish volunteers Albanian volunteers (Circassia) Circassian volunteers Chechen rebels Abkhazian rebels	Coalition Victory: Official recognition of de facto and de jure independence of the Balkan states.; Treaty of San Stefano; Treaty of Berlin; Treaty of Constantinople
Timok Rebellion (1883)	Kingdom of Serbia: Royal Serbian Army	People's Radical Party	Victory: Victory of King Milan.; Rebellion Suppressed
Serbo-Bulgarian War (1885)	Serbia Supported by: Austria-Hungary	Bulgaria	Defeat: Recognition of Bulgarian unification
Macedonian struggle (1901)	Serbian Chetniks; Supported by: Serbia	VMRO; Ottoman Empire: Albanian Kachaks	Inconclusive: Widespread ethnic violence; Hostilities largely ceased after the Young Turk Revolution
First Balkan War (1912–1913); Part of the Balkan Wars	Balkan League: Bulgaria; Greece; Serbia; Montenegro; Italian Redshirts; Supported by: Russia	Ottoman Empire; Circassian volunteers Albanian volunteers and irregulars	Victory: Treaty of London
Serbian invasion of Albania (1912–1913); Part of the Balkan Wars	Kingdom of Serbia; Kingdom of Montenegro	Independent Albania Ottoman Empire; Albanian guerrillas Albanian Tribesmen	Victory: Serbia and Montenegro invade and defeat Ottoman forces and capture Kosovo, Macedonia, Northern Albania and Central Albania.; The Serbian army commits massacres against Albanians living in the occupied territories.; Serbia forms Drač County and other counties on Albanian-populated lands captured from the Ottomans.; Essad Pasha hands Shkodër over to Montenegro in return for Montenegrin support for the foundation of the Republic of Central Albania.; Treaty of London Serbia annexes large parts Kosovo and Macedonia and continues to occupy parts of northern Albania until 1920.; Albania gains Independence but loses half of its claimed territories gained after the Albanian revolt of 1912.
Tikveš Uprising (1913)	Serbia; Chetniks	IMRO; Supported by: Bulgaria	Victory: The uprising is brutally suppressed and the Bulgarian population is terrorized
Second Balkan War (1913); Part of the Balkan Wars	Serbia: Romania; Greece; Montenegro; Ottoman Empire	Bulgaria	Victory: Bulgarian defeat; Treaty of Bucharest; Treaty of Constantinople
Ohrid-Debar Uprising (1913)	Serbia; Chetniks; Greece	IMRO; Kachaks	Victory: The uprising is brutally suppressed; Thousands of Bulgarians and Albanians are killed; 30,000 Bulgarians expelled; 25,000 Albanians expelled
Third Peasant Revolt in Albania (September–October 1914)	Republic of Central Albania; Support: Kingdom of Serbia; Kingdom of Italy	Principality of Albania	Serbo-Italian backed Republic of Central Albania Victory: Toptani invades and captures Central Albania and Dibër with Italian and Serb support and reforms the Republic of Central Albania.; Durrës is captured by Toptani unopposed.
Serbian campaign and Balkans theatre (1914–1918); Part of the European theatre of World War I	Allied Powers: Serbia; Montenegro; Russia (until 1917); France (from 1915); United Kingdom (from 1915); Italy (from 1915); Greece (from 1917)	Central Powers: Bulgaria (from 1915); Austria-Hungary; Germany (from 1915); Ottoman Empire (1916–17)	Victory: Liberation of Serbia; Dissolution of Austria-Hungary; Creation of Yugoslavia; Treaty of Versailles; Treaty of Saint-Germain-en-Laye; Treaty of Neuilly; Treaty of Trianon; Treaty of Sèvres
Revolutions and interventions in Hungary (1918–1920); Part of the aftermath of World War I and the Revolutions of 1917–23	Czechoslovakia; Romania; Kingdom of Serbs, Croats and Slovenes; Prekmurje; Kingdom of Hungary France	Hungarian Republic; Hungarian Soviet Republic: Slovak Soviet Republic	Victory: Hungarian defeat; Collapse of the Hungarian Soviet Republic
Impresa di Pola (1918); Part of the Adriatic Campaign in 1918 and the Adriatic question	Italy	State of Slovenes, Croats and Serbs	Defeat: Death of Janko Vuković
1918–1920 unrest in Split (1918–1920); Part of the Adriatic question	Kingdom of Serbs, Croats and Slovenes; United States; Italy	(Kingdom of Italy) Italian nationalists renegades Italian Regency of Carnaro	Inconclusive: Italian irredentists destroy the Yugoslav Cultural Centre; Italian nationalists occupy Split for a brief period; Death of Tommaso Gulli and Aldo Rossi
Austro-Slovene conflict in Carinthia (1918–1919); Part of the aftermath of World War I	Kingdom of Serbs, Croats and Slovenes	German-Austria: Carinthia	Military victory: Carinthian plebiscite
Christmas Uprising (1919); Part of the aftermath of World War I and the creation of Yugoslavia	(Kingdom of Yugoslavia) Montenegrin Whites; Kingdom of Serbs, Croats and Slovenes	(Kingdom of Montenegro) Montenegrin Greens; Italy	Montenegrin Whites Victory: Uprising suppressed
Drenica-Dukagjin Uprisings (1919–1924)	Kingdom of Serbs, Croats and Slovenes	Kosovar Albanians; Committee for the National Defence of Kosovo; Diplomatic support: Albania	Victory: Death of Azem Galica; Dissolution of the Kosovo Committee; Thousands of Albanian civilians massacred or deported
Koplik War (1920–1921)	Kingdom of Serbs, Croats and Slovenes	Principality of Albania	Inconclusive: Yugoslav army invades Northern Albania; Yugoslavs are eventually forced to withdraw due to international pressure; United Kingdom insists on slight adaptations in the regions of Debar, Prizren and Kastrati in the interest of Yugoslavia.
Albanian-Yugoslav Border War (1921)	Kingdom of Yugoslavia; Kingdom of Greece; Republic of Mirdita	Principality of Albania	Military victory: Slight adjustments of the Albanian border in favor of Yugoslavia and incorporation of some territories
Zogist counter-revolution in Albania (1924)	(Albania) Ahmet Zogu supporters (Mati Tribesmen); Kingdom of Serbs, Croats and Slovenes: Royal Yugoslav Army; (Russia) Russian White émigré	Fan Noli supporters (Albanian peasants); Principality of Albania; Committee for the National Defence of Kosovo	Zogu-Yugoslav Victory: Fan Noli is ousted from power.; Ahmet Zogu forms the Albanian Republic and is made dictator.; Zogu's forces assassinate the leadership of the Committee for the National Defence of Kosovo.
Invasion of Yugoslavia (1941); Part of the Balkans campaign and Mediterranean theatre of World War II	Yugoslavia	Axis: Germany; Italy; Hungary; Bulgaria	Defeat: Axis occupation of Yugoslavia; Axis occupation of Serbia; Partition of Yugoslavia; Creation of pro-Axis puppet regimes; Continued anti-Axis resistance and beginning of Yugoslav civil war
World War II in Yugoslavia (1941–1945); Part of the European theatre of World War II	Allies: Yugoslav Partisans; Soviet Union (from 1944); Aerial and logistics support: United Kingdom (1943–45); United States (limited); Former Axis powers: Bulgaria (1944–45) Other factions: LANÇ (1944–45); Supported by: (Kingdom of Yugoslavia) Yugoslav government-in-exile (1944–45); Chetniks (1941-1942) Supported by: (Kingdom of Yugoslavia) Yugoslav government-in-exile (1941–44) Western Allies: United Kingdom (1941–43); United States (1941–43)	Axis: Germany; Italy (1941–43); Hungary (1941–44); Bulgaria (1941–44); Croatia (Note: Acceded to the Tripartite Pact, generally considered Axis powers (see e.g., Facts About the American Wars, Bowman, p. 432, which includes them in a list of "Axis powers", or The Library of Congress World War II Companion, Wagner, Osborne, & Reyburn, p. 39, which lists them as "The Axis").); German puppet states and governments: Serbia (1941–44); German Montenegro (1943–1944); Albania (1943–44); (Kingdom of Hungary) Government of National Unity (1944–45); Italian protectorates and dependencies: Albania (1941–43); Kingdom of Montenegro (1941–43); Chetniks (1942-1945)	Yugoslav Partisan Victory: Defeat of Nazi Germany and Axis in Yugoslavia; Defeat and overthrow of the Independent State of Croatia, Government of National Salvation and other Axis collaborators; Defeat of the Chetniks and their emigration; Communist-led Partisans abolish the Yugoslav monarchy; Establishment of Federal People's Republic of Yugoslavia under the rule of Josip Broz Tito; Postwar Titoist mass killings and repression; Communist purges in Serbia in 1944–45
Yugoslav Involvement in the Years of Lead (1970s-1980s)	Red Brigades; Front Line; October 22 Group; PAC; Continuous Struggle; Workers' Power; Workers' Autonomy Foreign supporters: RAF; Sigurimi (alleged) (Palestine Liberation Organization) PLO (alleged); KGB (alleged) (East Germany) Stasi (alleged); Mukhabarat el-Jamahiriya (alleged); Yugoslavia (UDBA)	New Order (Note: Banned, some joined Ordine Nero.); National Vanguard (Note: Banned. Its members joined Ordine Nero.); Black Order NAR (Note: Dismantled.); Third Position (Note: Dissolved by police. Used by NAR as a cover name later on.); Supported by: Propaganda Due; SISMI (factions); Magliana Gang; CIA; Cosa Nostra (alleged) (Italy) Italian Government: Armed Forces; Carabinieri; State Police; Supported by: Gladio; CIA	Defeat: Most militant groups feel apart or were disarmed; Establishment of strong ties between UDBA and the Red Brigades

== Contemporary period ==
Conflict	Combatant 1	Combatant 2	Results
Croatian War of Independence (1991–1995 (Note: There was no formal declaration of war. The first armed clash of the war was the Pakrac clash on 1 March 1991, followed by the Plitvice Lakes incident on 31 March 1991, when the first fatalities occurred. The last major combat operation was Operation Storm, from 5–8 August 1995. Formally, hostilities ceased when the Erdut Agreement was signed on 12 November 1995.)); Part of the Yugoslav Wars	1991–92: (Socialist Federal Republic of Yugoslavia) SFR Yugoslavia (Note: After all former Yugoslav federal republics except Serbia and Montenegro declared independence, the two declared the creation of a new country – the Federal Republic of Yugoslavia – on 27 April 1992, disbanding the JNA soon afterwards. Serb-controlled units of the JNA participated in combat operations throughout 1991 and up to May 1992 in support of the Republic of Serbian Krajina.); SAO Krajina; SAO Eastern Slavonia, Baranja and Western Syrmia; SAO Western Slavonia; 1992–95: Serbian Krajina (Note: Initially, SAO Krajina, SAO Western Slavonia, and SAO Eastern Slavonia, Baranja and Western Syrmia were separate entities and fought individually against the Croatian government. As of December 19, 1991, the SAOs became part of the RSK.); Republika Srpska (Note: In 1992–94, Republika Srpska was intermittently involved in Croatian military operations, mostly through provision of military and other aid to the RSK, occasional air raids launched from Mahovljani airbase near Banja Luka, and most significantly through artillery attacks against a number of cities in Croatia, especially Slavonski Brod, Županja, and Dubrovnik.)	1991–94: Croatia (Note: As determined by the Badinter Arbitration Committee, SFR Yugoslavia dissolved during the war. On 25 June 1991, the Croatian parliament declared the independence of Croatia, following a referendum held in May. The decision was suspended for three months; the declaration became effective on 8 October 1991, and Croatia was no longer part of Yugoslavia.); 1994–95: Croatia; Bosnia and Herzegovina (Note: Bosnia and Herzegovina was particularly significant for the war in late 1994 and in 1995. Pursuant to the Washington Agreement, the Federation of Bosnia and Herzegovina was formed as a subunit of the Republic of Bosnia and Herzegovina (RBiH) representing both Bosnian Croat and Bosniak (Bosnian Muslim) ethnic groups. Most significantly, the Washington Agreement specifically permitted Croatian Army to enter Bosnia and Herzegovina, thereby allowing operations Cincar and Winter '94 against the army of Republika Srpska, outflanking the RSK capital at Knin and creating a new strategic situation before the decisive battles of the war.)	Croatian victory: Erdut agreement; Yugoslav army formally withdrew from Croatia from January 1992 under the Sarajevo Agreement; Croatian forces regained control over most of Republic of Serbian Krajina-held territory; Eastern Slavonia remained under Serbian control until 1996 when it came under effective UN control; Croatian forces advanced into Bosnia and Herzegovina to assist the united Bosnian and Croatian side, which led to the eventual end of the Bosnian War in December 1995; The Croatian government gains control over the vast majority of territory previously held by rebel Serbs, with the remainder coming under UNTAES control. (Note: Three months after the military defeat of the RSK in Operation Storm, the UN-sponsored Erdut Agreement between the Croatian and RSK authorities was signed on 12 November 1995. The agreement provided for a two-year transitional period, later extended by a year, during which the remaining occupied territory of Croatia was to be transferred to control of the Croatian government. The agreement was implemented by UNTAES and successfully completed by 1998.)
Bosnian War (1992–1995); Part of the Yugoslav Wars	Until May 1992: Republika Srpska; Serbian Krajina; SFR Yugoslavia (Note: After all former Yugoslav federal republics except Serbia and Montenegro declared independence, the two declared the creation of a new country – the Federal Republic of Yugoslavia – on 27 April 1992, disbanding the JNA soon afterwards. Serb-controlled units of the JNA participated in combat operations throughout 1991 and up to May 1992 in support of the Republic of Serbian Krajina.) May 1992–94: Republika Srpska; Serbian Krajina; Western Bosnia; Supported by: FR Yugoslavia 1994–95: Republika Srpska; Serbian Krajina; Western Bosnia; Supported by: FR Yugoslavia	Until October 1992: Bosnia and Herzegovina; Herzeg-Bosnia; Croatia October 1992–94: Bosnia and Herzegovina October 1992–94: Herzeg-Bosnia; Croatia 1994–95: Bosnia and Herzegovina^{b} Herzeg-Bosnia; Croatia; Supported by: NATO (bombing operations, 1995)	Military stalemate: Dayton agreement; Over 101,000 dead, largely Bosniaks.; Deployment of NATO-led forces to oversee the peace agreement.; Establishment of the Office of the High Representative to oversee the civilian implementation of the peace agreement.; International recognition of Bosnia and Herzegovina as a sovereign state; Internal partition of Bosnia and Herzegovina according to the Dayton Accords.; Republika Srpska is recognised as one of two entities that form Bosnia and Herzegovina
Kosovo War (1998–1999); Part of the Yugoslav Wars	FR Yugoslavia	Kosovo Liberation Army; FARK (Note: From August 1998 as the Kosovo Liberation Army as 138th Brigade.); NATO (from 24 March 1999): Belgium; Canada; Denmark; France; Germany; Italy; Netherlands; Norway; Portugal; Spain; Turkey; United Kingdom; United States	Kumanovo Agreement: KLA defeat and failure to hold any significant amount of Kosovo by end of the war; Yugoslav forces withdraw from Kosovo; United Nations Resolution 1244; Yugoslavia maintains sovereignty and territorial integrity over Kosovo; Yugoslav army managed to largely suppress the KLA activity in Kosovo by May 1999; Return of Albanian refugees; Flight or expulsion of over half of the Serb and other non-Albanian civilians; Surrender and demilitarisation of the KLA; Establishment of KFOR; No de jure changes to Yugoslav borders according to Resolution 1244, but de facto and partial de jure political and economic independence of Kosovo from FR Yugoslavia due to being placed under UN administration
Insurgency in the Preševo Valley (1999–2001); Part of the Yugoslav Wars	FR Yugoslavia KFOR	UÇPMB	Yugoslav victory: Končulj Agreement; Yugoslavia retakes the buffer zone; UÇPMB disbanded; Amnesty for UÇPMB members; Low intensity skirmishes continue; FR Yugoslavia regains control of demilitarized Ground Safety Zone, including around 580 square kilometres (220 sq mi) previously held by the UÇPMB

== See also ==
- List of wars involving Serbia in the Middle Ages
- List of Serbian rebellions
