= Mongol invasion of Serbia =

For the Mongol invasions of Serbia, see:

- Mongol invasion of Bulgaria and Serbia (1242) by the army of Kadan of the horde of Batu Khan
- Serbian conflict with the Nogai Horde (1291) by the Golden Horde under Nogai Khan
