= Niš rebellion =

Niš rebellion may refer to:

- Niš rebellion (1821)
- Niš rebellion (1835)
- Niš rebellion (1841)
