= Spasiya Dzhurenova =

Bulgarian folklore singer

Spasiya Dzurenova
- Спасия Джуренова
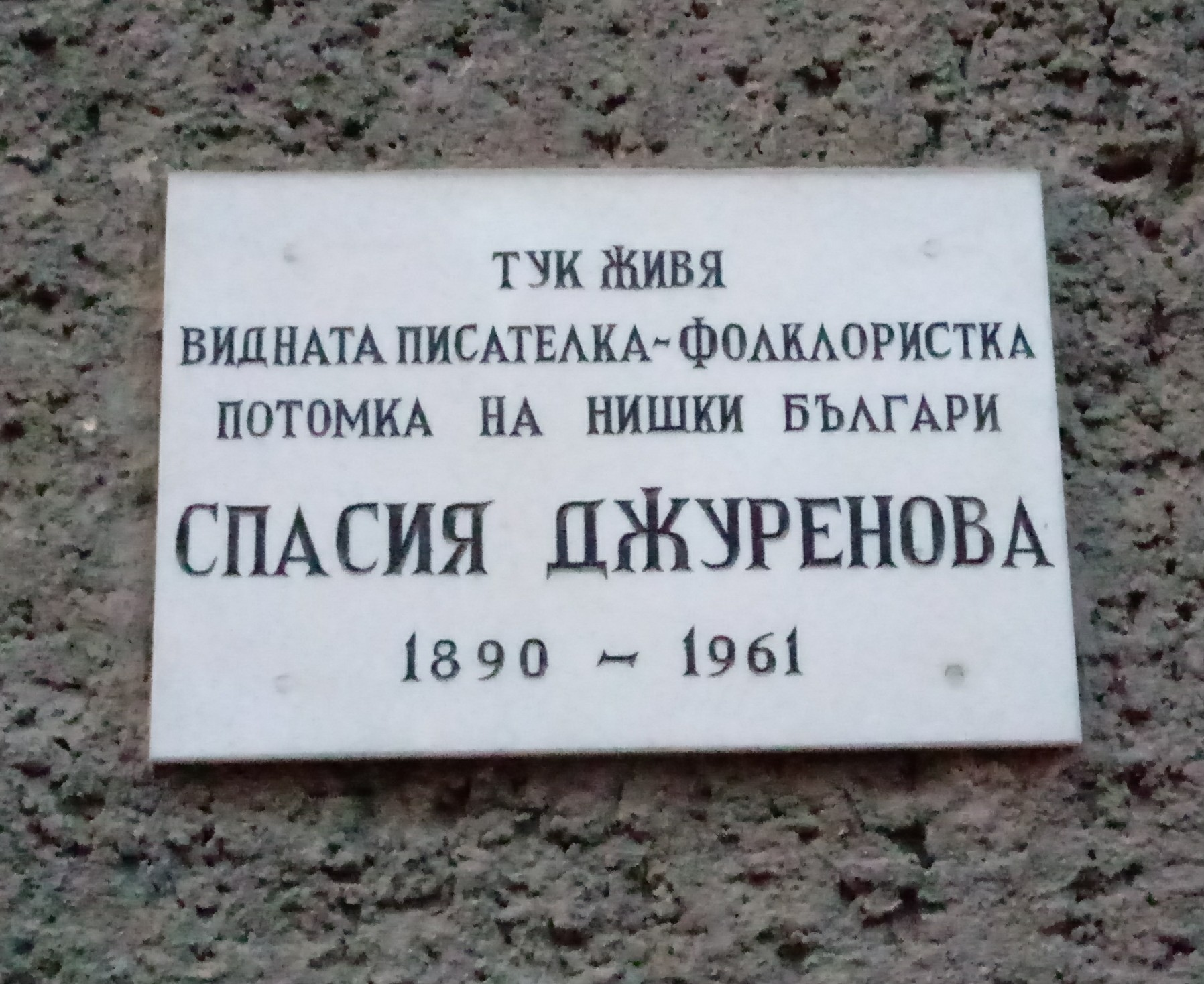
- Home plate of where Spasiya Dzhurenova lived in Sofia
- Born: 1 October 1890
- Died: 8 December 1961 (aged 71)
- Citizenship: Bulgarian
- Known for: Folklore singer, folklorist, writer

Spasiya Dzhurenova (1890–1961) was a Bulgarian folklore singer and a folklorist.

== Early life ==
Dzhurenova was born into a family descending from Nis, Serbia. Her father's parents were refugees from a village torched by Ottoman oppressors during the Nis rebellion of 1841. They then relocated to Pazardzhik, where her father was later born. Her mother was a local Bulgarian.

At age 20, Spasiya Dzhurenova married Iliya Dzurenov, with whom she moved to Sofia.

== Career ==
Dzhurenova traveled and sang until she retired at 60.

In her retirement, she wrote down all the songs and stories she knew with the help of her son Ivan Dzhurenov. She transcribed over 180 folklore songs and 200 stories, anecdotes, legends, and fables. She also contributed pieces on simple medicine.

More than three publishing houses issue her works, as well as the Bulgarian Academy of Sciences.

== Legacy ==
Some of her most famous fairy tales are "Baba Razkazva", "Darvoto na Zhivota", "Kon Zvezdeliya", and others.

Among Bulgarian traditional folklore and fairy tales, her stories are considered the most well-written.

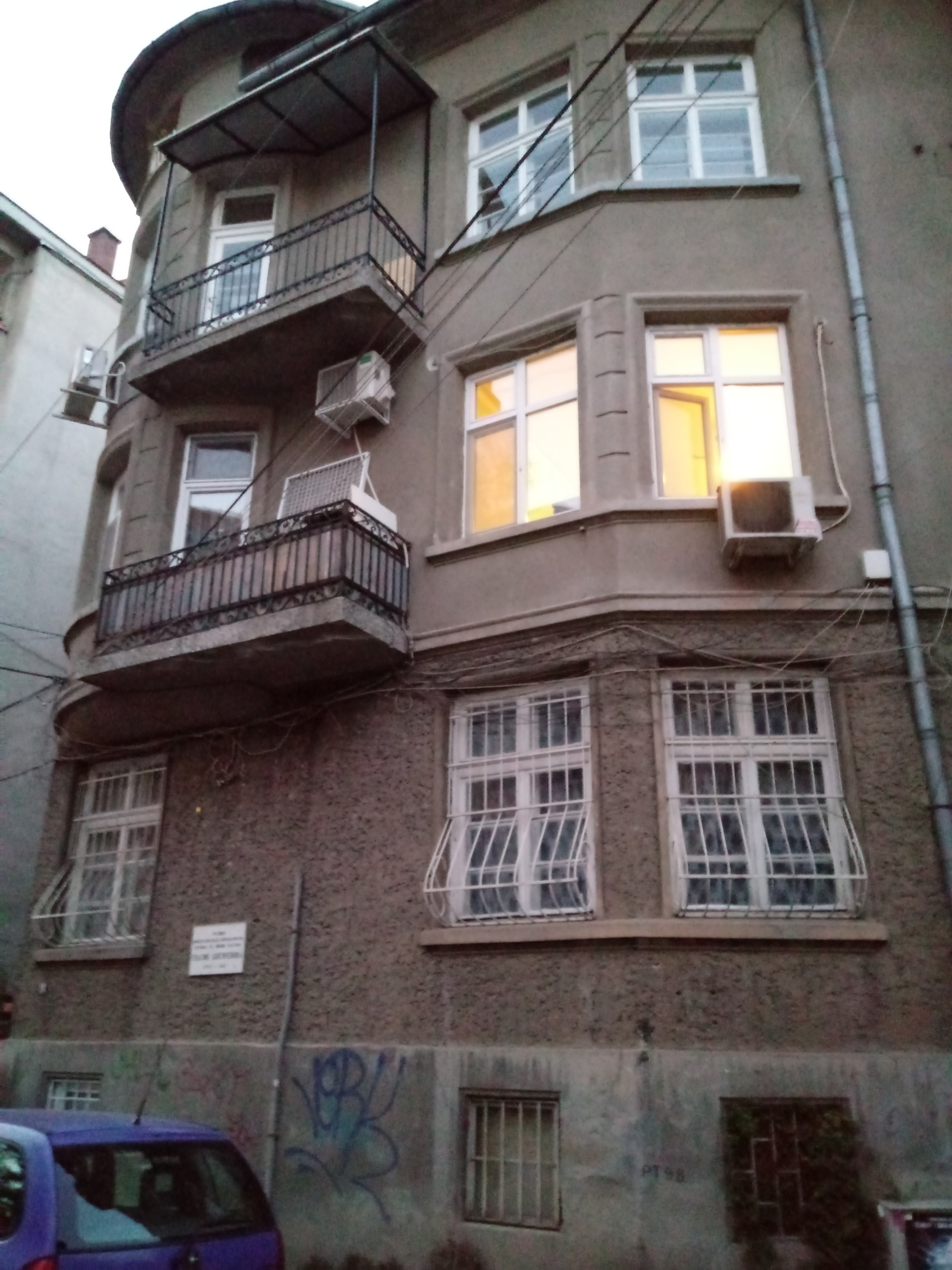
The Home of Spasiya Dzhurenova in Sofia, Bulgaria

After she died in 1961, her home in Sofia was labelled with a memorial plaque.
