= Kruščica, Bela Crkva =

Kruščica Крушчица
- Village (Selo)
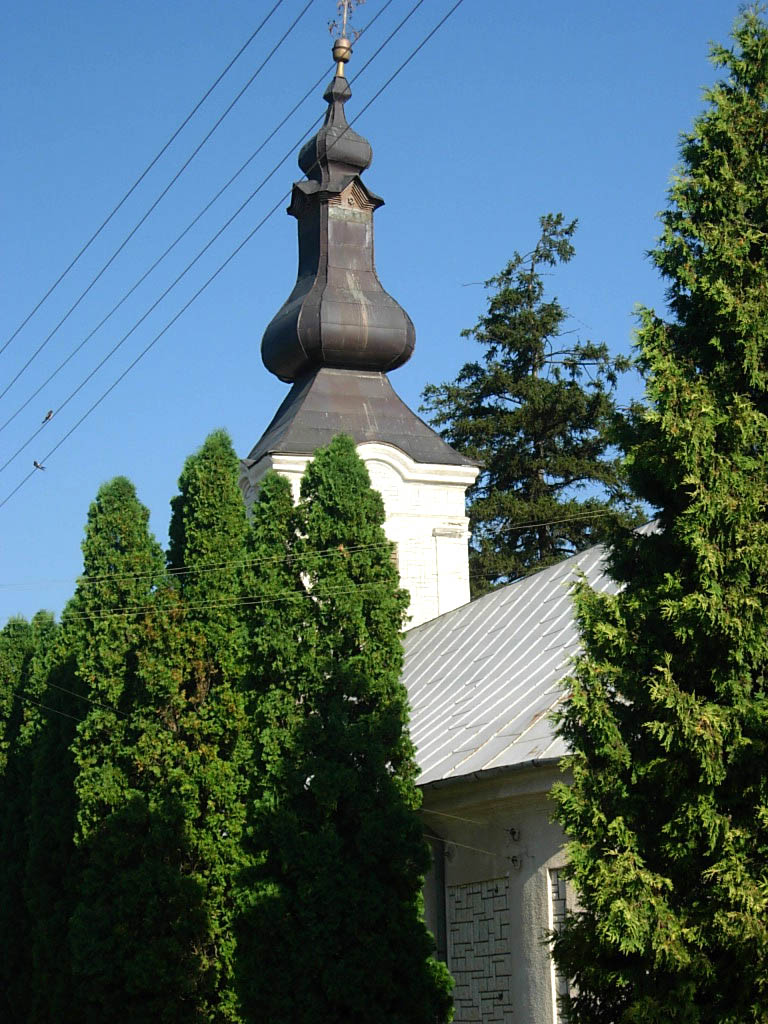
- The Orthodox church

- Location of Kruščica within Serbia Kruščica (Serbia) Kruščica (Europe)
- Coordinates: 44°52′21″N 21°15′11″E
- Country: Serbia
- Province: Vojvodina
- District: South Banat
- Municipality: Bela Crkva
- Elevation: 166 m (545 ft)

Population (2002)
  - Kruščica: 989
- Time zone: UTC+1 (CET)
  - Summer (DST): UTC+2 (CEST)
- Area code: +381(0)13
- Car plates: VŠ

Kruščica (Serbian Cyrillic: Крушчица) is a village in Serbia. It is situated in the Bela Crkva municipality, in the South Banat District, Vojvodina province. The village has a Serb ethnic majority (71.38%) with a sizable Czech minority (23.35%) and a population of 989 people, according to the 2002 census.

== Name ==
Names in other languages: Czech: Kruščice, German: Kruschtschitz, Hungarian: Körtéd.

== Czech minority ==
The first Czechs appeared in Kruščica in 1834. Settlers from the first wave of Czech immigrants came from Czech settlement villages in the mountains of the Romanian Banat – from Gârnic, Ravensca, Șumița and Bigăr. Subsequently, Czechs also started moving to Kruščica directly from the Czech lands, mostly from central and south-western Bohemia. Currently (2022), the Czech association in Kruščica operates in the village, which also manages the local Czech cultural house. In the past, there was a Czech school in Kruščica (it closed in 1964), today Czech language is taught by a teacher sent by the Foreign Cooperation House (of course, he also works in other Czech settlements of the Serbian Banat). The Czechs there are mostly Roman Catholic, in 1912 they were behind the building of the Church of St. Wenceslas, in which mass is celebrated in Czech to this day.

== Historical population ==
- 1961: 1,738
- 1971: 1,478
- 1981: 1,279
- 1991: 1,185
- 2002: 989

== Gallery ==
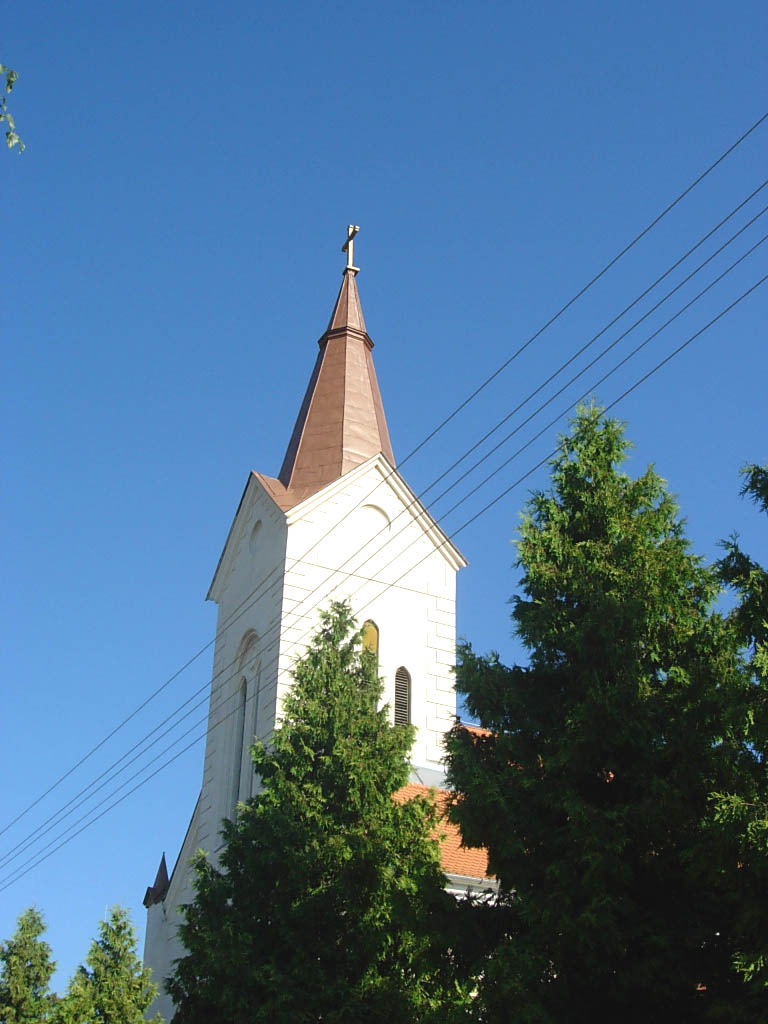
The Saint Wenceslaus Archduke Catholic Church.

== See also ==
- Kruščica Rebellion
- List of places in Serbia
- List of cities, towns and villages in Vojvodina
