= Serbian conflict with the Nogai Horde =

13th-century Mongol attacks

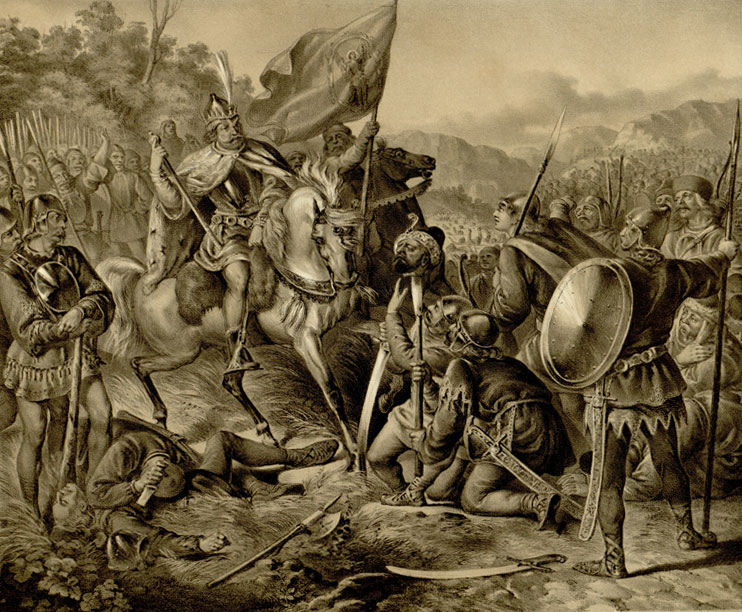
- Serbian king Milutin after a victory over the Mongols (19th-century lithograph)
Date	1280s–1290s
Location	Kingdom of Serbia
Result	Serbian victory
Territorial changes	Kingdom of Syrmia annexes Braničevo and Kučevo and Kingdom of Serbia captures Shishman's territory

Belligerents
Kingdom of Serbia; Kingdom of Syrmia; Kingdom of Hungary	Nogai Horde; Golden Horde; Byzantine Empire

Commanders and leaders
Stefan Milutin; Stefan Dragutin	Darman †; Kudelin †; Shishman of Vidin (surrendered); Blackhead (POW) (executed)

Strength
Unknown	Unknown, larger

Casualties and losses
Unknown	Heavy

The Mongol (Tatar) clique of Nogai Khan, a part of the larger Golden Horde, was heavily involved in the Kingdom of Serbia in the 1280s and 1290s. A serious invasion was threatened in 1292 but was averted when Serbia accepted Mongol lordship. The Balkan push of Nogai's clique was broader than just Serbia. In 1292, it resulted in the deposition and exile of King George I of Bulgaria.

The sporadic conflict with the Golden Horde was the second major confrontation of the Serbs with the Mongols after the Mongol invasion of Serbia in 1242.

== 1282–83 ==
In 1282, the Serbian king Stefan Milutin invaded northern Macedonia, then a part of the Byzantine Empire. The Emperor Michael VIII was distracted at the time by his conflict with the Despot John I of Thessaly, however, and called upon Nogai Khan to provide him with troops to attack Thessaly. Nogai sent 4,000 cavalrymen, who arrived in Thrace in October. On 11 December, however, Michael VIII died. His son, Andronikos II, did not wish to pursue the attack on Thessaly, so instead sent the Mongols across the Danube to, in the words of Nicephoros Gregoras, "weaken [the Serbs] and then to return with plunder over the Danube". The army, which included Byzantine auxiliaries, was placed under the command of Michael Tarchaneiotes.

In early 1283, the Byzantine–Mongol force crossed the Danube and plundered as far as Lipljan and Prizren. A Mongol detachment attempted to cross the river Drim and was defeated by the Serbs. Their leader, named Blackhead according to the Serbian archbishop Danilo II, was captured and beheaded. A majority of the Mongols must have returned, however, since Gregoras calls the entire mission a success.

The Serbs were not weakened or deterred by Andronikos' operation. In the fall of 1283, Milutin invaded Macedonia again, penetrating all the way to Kavala on the Aegean coast.

== 1284–85 ==
According to the Danilo, in the early 1280s the Bulgarian princes Darman and Kudelin were harassing the Hungarian banate of Macsó (Mačva) with the help of their Tatar (Mongol) and Cuman allies. In late 1284, King Ladislaus IV of Hungary gave Macsó, including Belgrade and some territory in northern Bosnia, to the deposed Serbian king Dragutin, who in 1282 had set up his own Kingdom of Syrmia. In 1285, Dragutin allied with Hungary and attacked Darman and Kudelin. This attack was repulsed and the Bulgarians with their Cuman and Tatar mercenaries ravaged Dragutin's lands. They occupied Macsó and Dragutin himself was forced to flee to the court of Milutin.

== 1291–92 ==
According to a letter from King Andrew III of Hungary, in the winter of 1291–92 the region of Macsó (which was under Dragutin) was attacked by Mongols and he sent an army there to defend it. This attack on Macsó could have come from Bulgarian or Serbian territory, most likely that of Darman and Kudelin. Later in 1292, Dragutin allied with Milutin and together they defeated Darman and Kudelin. Dragutin annexed the regions of Braničevo and Kučevo from them and they fled across the Danube to Mongol territory. From there, they unsuccessfully urged Nogai to attack Serbia. Instead, the latter favoured an indirect approach through his subject, the semi-independent warlord Shishman of Vidin.

Following the annexation of Braničevo, the borders of Dragutin's Serbia were brought up to the territory of Shishman. He may have been an erstwhile ally or even vassal of Darman and Kudelin; he was certainly a vassal of the Golden Horde, which may have even installed him in Vidin. In 1292, he "gathered thrice-cursed Tatar heretics and his own soldiers", in the words of Danilo, and invaded Milutin's Serbia. Possibly Milutin's forces had been the decisive factor in the Serbian victory over Darman and Kudelin.

Shishman's army contained a large number of Mongols and, unlike in the armies of Darman and Kudelin, these were not mercenaries. His invasion was no more than a plundering raid, but it plundered deep into Serbian territory and caused major devastation, including the burning of the monastery of Žiča. He was defeated near Ždrelo and then retreated. In response, Milutin invaded Shishman's territory and took Vidin, forcing Shishman to flee across the Danube to the territory of the Golden Horde. Soon after, Shishman was re-installed in Vidin under Serbian suzerainty, probably at the insistence of the Mongols. This probably happened in 1292. To seal the alliance, Shishman married the daughter of a Serbian župan named Dragoš, and his son Michael III married Milutin's daughter Ana-Neda.

Despite their obvious diplomatic victory, since Shishman was back on the throne in Vidin, the Mongols of the Golden Horde clearly regarded Milutin's successes as at their expense. According to Danilo, he "began preparations to strike [Milutin] with heathen forces, wanting to seize his lands". Warned in advance of Nogai's preparations, Milutin sent an embassy to the khan's court, where evidently he offered to accept Mongol overlordship. Danilo records that afterwards, he sent his son Stefan Dečanski, the future king of Serbia, and "the high nobles of Serbian lands" to Nogai's court. These could only have been hostages and possibly a small military contingent. In any case, they were symbols of Serbian submission. This must have taken place between 1293 and 1294. Dečanski remained a hostage until 1297.

One casualty of Milutin's new relationship with Nogai was probably his marriage to Elizabeth of Hungary. She was no longer acting as queen by 1296, probably owing to the continued anti-Mongol policy of Hungary.

== Sources ==
- Fine, John V. A. (1987). The Late Medieval Balkans: A Critical Survey from the Late Twelfth Century to the Ottoman Conquest. University of Michigan Press.
- Jackson, Peter (2005). The Mongols and the West, 1221–1410. Routledge.
- Vásáry, István (2005). Cumans and Tatars: Oriental Military in the Pre-Ottoman Balkans, 1185–1365. Cambridge University Press.
- Uzelac, Aleksandar (2011). "Tatars and Serbs at the End of the Thirteenth Century". Revista de Istorie Militară (5/6): 9–20.
