= Darman and Kudelin =

Bulgarian nobles

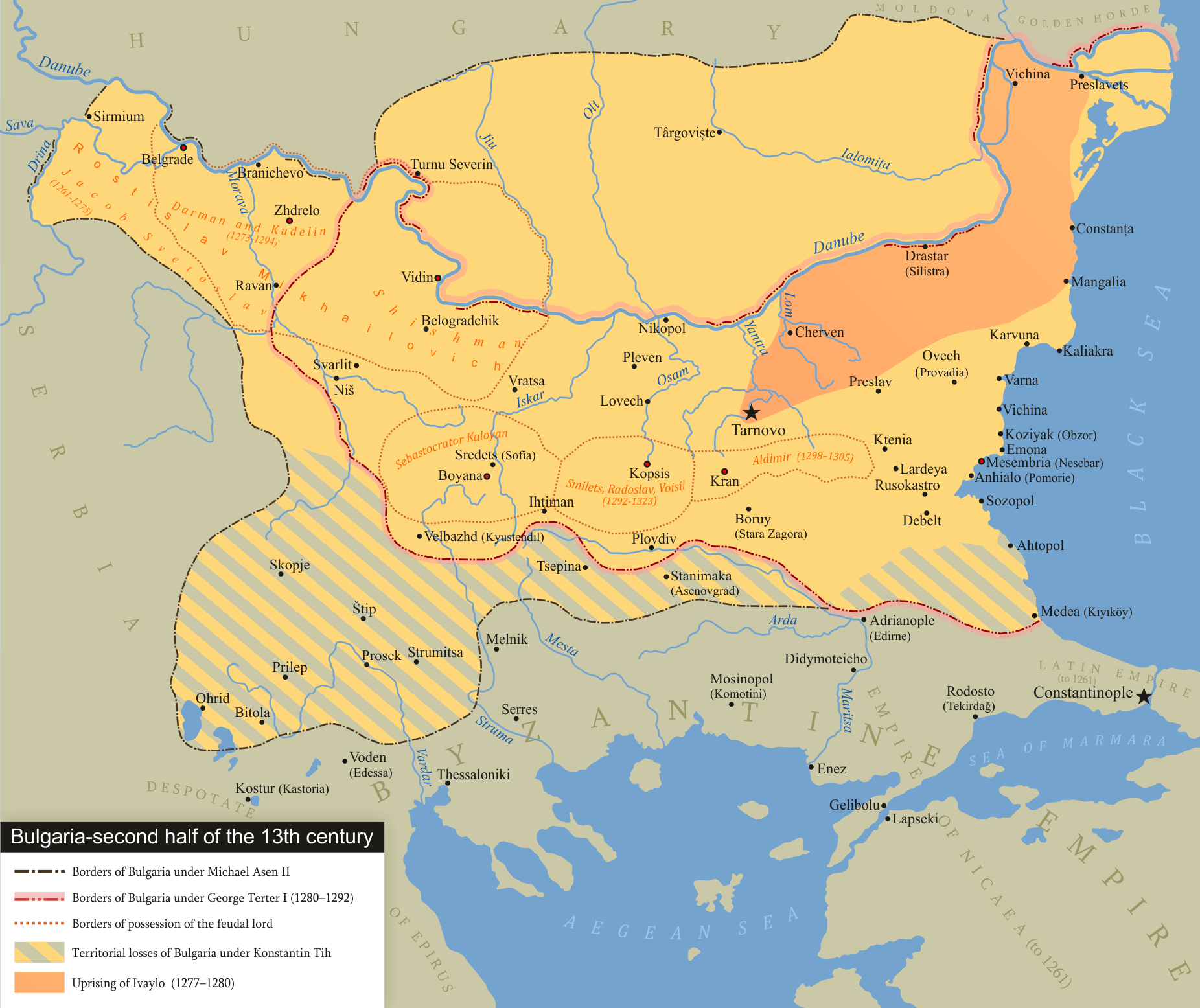
The Bulgarian lands in the late 13th century: Darman and Kudelin's semi-independent domain is in the northwest

Darman (Bulgarian: Дърман; also Drman, Dǎrman, Durman, Dorman) and Kudelin (Bulgarian: Куделин) were two Bulgarian boyars of Cuman origin who jointly ruled the regions of Braničevo and Kučevo (in modern Serbia) in the late 13th century (1273–1291). The two brothers used the weakened state of centralized administration in the region to become independent from the Kingdom of Hungary or the Second Bulgarian Empire in 1273. The capital of their domains was the fortress of Ždrelo, on the Mlava river. Relying on auxiliary troops that consisted mostly of Tatar and Cuman mercenaries, the brothers were “very independent-minded and afraid of no one”, according to Serbian archbishop Danilo II.

They regularly attacked their western neighbour, the Hungarian vassal Stefan Dragutin's Syrmian Kingdom, in Mačva, an area previously under the sovereignty of Elizabeth of Hungary. The Hungarian queen had sent troops to claim Braničevo in 1282–1284, but her forces were repelled and her vassal lands plundered in retaliation. Another campaign, this time organized by both Dragutin and Elizabeth, failed to conquer Darman and Kudelin's domains in 1285 and suffered another counter-raid by the brothers who managed to conquer Mačva in 1290, relying on Tatar mercenaries recruited on the Wallachian Plain with the approval of Tatar ruler Nogai. In 1292, after the Hungarians inflicted a defeat on the Tatars in the brothers' service on the banks of the Sava river during the winter, a joint force of Dragutin and his brother, the Serbian king Stefan Uroš II Milutin, managed to defeat Darman and Kudelin and conquered their region, which came for the first time under the rule of a Serb. The brothers either flew to Nogai or were killed in this campaign, as they disappear from the historical sources thereafter.

Darman and Kudelin were relatives or close associates of the Bulgarian despotēs Shishman of Vidin, the founder of the Shishman dynasty of Bulgarian rulers, as he proceeded to attack the Serbian domains to his west, presumably as a response to Dragutin's conquest of the neighbouring Braničevo.

== Sources ==
- Бакалов, Георги; Куманов, Милен (2003). "Дърман (краят на XIII в.); Куделин (втората половина на XIII в.)". Електронно издание "История на България" (in Bulgarian). Sofia: Trud. ISBN 954528613X.
- Ćirković, Sima (2004). The Serbs. Malden: Blackwell Publishing. ISBN 9781405142915.
- Fine, John Van Antwerp Jr. (1994). The Late Medieval Balkans: A Critical Survey from the Late Twelfth Century to the Ottoman Conquest (2 ed.). Ann Arbor, Michigan: University of Michigan Press. ISBN 0472082604.
- Madgearu, Alexandru J (2017). The Asanids: the political and military history of the second Bulgarian Empire (1185-1280). Leiden. ISBN 9789004333192. OCLC 959667469.
- Uzelac, Aleksandar (2011). "Tatars and Serbs at the End of the Thirteenth Century". Revista de istorie militară. 5–6: 9–20.
- Vásáry, István (2005). Cumans and Tatars: Oriental Military in the Pre-Ottoman Balkans, 1185–1365. Cambridge: Cambridge University Press. ISBN 9781139444088.
- Živković, Vojislav (2021). Serbian Kings Dragutin and Milutin. The Problem of the Succession of the Serbian Throne at the End of the 13th and Beginning of the 14th Century. Niš & Vranje: Centar za crkvene studije; Svepravoslavno društvo Prepodobni Justin Ćelijski i Vranjski. ISBN 978-86-84105-59-4.
