= Kruščica rebellion =

1808 rebellion in the Austrian Empire

In 1808 a short-lived rebellion aimed at national and social liberation broke out in the Banat region in the Military Frontier of the Habsburg monarchy, stirred by the First Serbian Uprising in the Sanjak of Smederevo of the Ottoman Empire. Led by Serbs and Romanians, it followed a short-lived Serb rebellion in Syrmia in 1807. The initiators were Orthodox priest Dimitrije Georgijević (or Đorđević) from Kruščica, former Free Corps members, captain Marijan Jovanović (or Josipović) and oberstlieutenant Pivu Žumanka (or Šumanka), and young lieutenant Toma Skripeće (or Stipeće). The organizers were in contact with the Serbian rebel leaders Milenko Stojković, Luka Lazarević and Petar Dobrnjac. The rebellion was planned in the Wallachian-Illyrian Regiment. The Serbs and Romanians each sought the liberation of their people. Dimitrije Georgijević repeated to his followers that the main goal was the restoration of the Serbian Empire.

The rebellion, known in historiography as the Kruščica rebellion (Serbian: Крушчичка буна/Kruščička buna), lasted only a day, 12 July, breaking out near Bela Crkva, at the time part of the Banatian Military Frontier. The rebel leaders called people to join the rebellion, and also used a false letter supposedly written by Karađorđe. The rebellion started by church bells ringing, after which the priest, escorted by the people, started riding towards the place where Karađorđe supposedly was to meet them. However, instead of meeting with Karađorđe, the rebels met a squad of Austrian troops, which immediately escorted them to the prison. Skripeće was sentenced to death and executed in 1811, while Dimitrije Đorđević was sentenced to life in prison.

== Sources ==
- Balcanica. Vol. 36. Balkanoloski institut. 2006. pp. 122–123.
- Popović, Dušan J. (1963). Srbi u Vojvodini (3): Od Temišvarskog sabora do Blagoveštenskog sabora 1861. Matica srpska.
- Stojančević, Dejan; Miličević, Jovan; Popov, Čedomir; Jovanović, Radoman; Ekmečić, Milorad (1981). Stojančević, Dejan (ed.). Историја српског народа: Од Првог устанка до Берлинског конгреса (1804-1878). Vol. 1. Belgrade: Srpska književna zadruga.
