= Mongol invasion of Bulgaria and Serbia =

- Part of the Mongol invasion of Europe
Date	1242–1243
Location	Bulgaria and Serbia
Result	Mongol victory

Belligerents
Mongol Empire	Second Bulgarian Empire; Serbian Kingdom

Commanders and leaders
Batu Khan; Kadan	Kaliman I of Bulgaria (Note: Kaliman I was a child ruler and Bulgaria was governed by a regency.); Stefan Vladislav

During the Mongol invasion of Europe, Mongol tumens led by Batu Khan and Kadan invaded Serbia and then Bulgaria in the spring of 1242 after defeating the Hungarians at the Battle of Mohi and ravaging the Hungarian regions of Croatia, Dalmatia, and Bosnia.

Initially, the troops of Kadan moved south along the Adriatic Sea into Serbian territory. Then, turning east, it crossed the centre of the country—plundering as it went—and entered Bulgaria, where it was joined by the rest of the army under Batu. The campaigning in Bulgaria probably happened mainly in the north, where archaeology yields evidence of destruction from this period. The Mongols did, however, cross Bulgaria to attack the Latin Empire to its south before withdrawing completely. Bulgaria was forced to pay tribute to the Mongols, and this continued thereafter.

== Background ==
Relations between Hungary and Serbia were poor on the eve of the Mongol invasion. The Serbian king, Stefan Vladislav, had married Beloslava, daughter of Tsar Ivan Asen II of Bulgaria, in 1234 in an effort to form an anti-Hungarian alliance. By the time of the Mongol invasion, however, there were good relations between Hungary and Bulgaria. The Bulgarian tsar, the child Kaliman I, was a nephew of the Hungarian king, Béla IV, being the son of Béla's sister, Anna Maria, and Ivan Asen II. Around 1240, facing the threat of Mongol invasion, the Hungarians, Bulgarians, and Cumans may have entered into an alliance, as evidenced by the presence in that year of a Bulgarian emissary at Béla IV's court.

One of the reasons for the Mongol invasion of Hungary was that Béla IV had given shelter to the Cumans when they fled the Mongol conquest of their land in 1239. After the Cuman leader, Köten, was assassinated by Hungarians opposed to Béla's policy on 17 March 1241, a large number of Cumans devastated the Hungarian countryside while retreating into Bulgaria, where they were again granted shelter. A separate group of Cumans entered Bulgaria about the same time, crossing the Black Sea after the Mongol conquest of Cumania, having arranged for their settlement with Ivan Asen. This is recorded by Ibn Taghribirdi, a 15th-century writer relying on the lost work of Izz al-Din ibn Shaddad, himself a Syrian writing in exile from Egypt after the Mongol conquest of Syria. Izz al-Din's source was the eyewitness Badr al-Din Baysari, himself a Cuman whose family fled to Bulgaria. The future sultan of Egypt, Baibars, born in 1227 or 1228, was among those who fled to Bulgaria from the Mongols. According to Ibn Taghribirdi, the Bulgarians later turned on these Cumans. Baysari and Baibars were captured and sold into slavery in Rum. The Cumans of Köten, on the other hand, seem to have integrated themselves into the Bulgarian aristocracy.

The decision by the Mongols to attack Bulgaria with all their forces may have had the same motive as the initial attack on Hungary: to punish the Bulgarians for giving aid to the Mongols' enemies.

After the successful campaigns of Tsar Ivan Asen II against the Despotate of Epirus and the Latin Empire, Bulgaria in 1242 was at the zenith of its power. It covered all of Moesia and Macedonia and most of Thrace, stretching from the Black Sea to Eastern Albania and from the Lower Danube to the Aegean. Its population was ethnically mixed, consisting of Slavic-speaking Bulgarians and Romance-speaking Vlachs. Some contemporaries called the area Vlachia. The nomadic Cumans also settled in this region at that time.

In dealing with the Mongol invasions, writers also had to distinguish between Bulgaria on the Danube and the distant Bulgaria on the Volga, which they called, respectively, "Little (or Lesser) Bulgaria" (Bulgaria minor) and "Great (or Greater) Bulgaria" (Bulgaria maior or magna Bulgaria).

== Serbia ==
When the Mongol commander Kadan withdrew from the invasion of Hungary, he entered Bosnia in late March or early April 1242. Although nominally under Hungarian suzerainty, part of Bosnia had been occupied by Hungarian crusaders opposed to the Bosnian Church while the remainder was under the control of Ban Matej Ninoslav. The passing-through of the Mongols forced the Hungarians to evacuate the territory and allowed Ninoslav to resume control of the whole of Bosnia.

Places in Zeta (modern Montenegrin borders shown) attacked by the Mongols (red) or spared (green)

Continuing south, the Mongols entered the Serbian region of Zeta (roughly Montenegro and northern Albania). According to Archdeacon Thomas of Split, they inflicted minimal damage on independent Dubrovnik, which was too strong to take. In Zeta, however, the forces of Kadan attacked Kotor, razed to the ground Svač and Drisht and probably also destroyed Sapë, which was only rebuilt several decades later. In Thomas's words, the Mongols left behind in Zeta "nobody to piss against a wall". The city of Ulcinj may have been spared because of an agreement reached with Dubrovnik in April. There is no record that they met any resistance, and it is possible that George, the governor of Zeta, sought to use them to detach his principality from Serbian overlordship. He began to use the title of "king" at this time.

According to Thomas of Split, a contemporary and partial eyewitness, the Mongols "overran all of Serbia and came to Bulgaria" (totam Serviam percurrentes in Bulgariam devenerunt). Another contemporary, the archdeacon Roger of Várad from Hungarian Transylvania, notes that "Kadan destroyed Bosnia and the kingdom of Rascia and then crossed into Bulgaria" (Cadan ... destruxit Boznam, regnum Rascie et inde in Bulgariam pertransivit). This is all that is known about the invasion of Serbia proper (Rascia) from literary sources. The raiding and looting in Serbia was over by late spring, when the tumens had moved on to Bulgaria.

In the 1250s, William of Rubruck, a Flemish missionary in the Mongol Empire, reported that a French goldsmith, Guillaume Boucher, in the Mongol capital of Karakorum had been captured in Belegrave by the forces of Bujek, a son of Tolui (and not by Kadan). This location is usually identified with Belgrade. If so, then Belgrade, which been under Hungarian control since 1235, was probably occupied by the Mongols in 1241 or 1242. If the former date is correct, it is likely that the Mongols crossed the Danube at Kovin, an important crossing, where evidence of destruction from that period has been unearthed. A large coin hoard buried in 1241 has been found at the nearby fortress of Dupljaja. If the Mongols under Bujek did not take Belgrade while crossing into Croatia in 1241, it is possible that Kadan took it—the Hungarians having evacuated—in 1242 while devastating Serbia.

Although Stefan Vladislav was overthrown by his nobles in 1243, nothing suggests that this was related to his response to the Mongol invasion. His brother and successor, Stefan Uroš I (died 1276), married a Catholic noblewoman, Helen of Anjou (died 1314). It is recorded that in the predominantly Catholic region around Lake Scutari in Zeta she repaired and rebuilt many towns, churches, and monasteries damaged and destroyed by the Mongols in 1242.

== Bulgaria ==
Places in Bulgaria (modern boundary shown) with evidence of Mongol destruction.
Places in northern Dobruja (now Romania) with evidence of Mongol destruction.

Having passed through Bosnian and Serb lands, Kadan joined up with the main army under Batu in Bulgaria, probably towards the end of spring. There is archaeological evidence of widespread destruction in central and northeastern Bulgaria around 1242. There are several narrative sources of the Mongol invasion of Bulgaria, but none is detailed and they present distinct pictures of what transpired. It is clear, though, that two forces entered Bulgaria at the same time: Kadan's from Serbia and another, led by Batu himself or Bujek, from across the Danube.

A marginal notation in a Greek manuscript in the Vatican Secret Archives notes that it was purchased by a certain Theodore Grammatikos after the Mongol invasion of Bulgaria, in the year 6751 Anno Mundi in the Byzantine calendar. The year 6751 corresponds to the period from 1 September 1242 to the 31 August 1243.

The destruction of Bulgaria is mentioned by the contemporary Brabantine theologian Thomas of Cantimpré. Writing a little later, the Italian missionary Ricoldo of Montecroce wrote that the Mongols had conquered the Vlachs. According to the Persian historian Rashid-al-Din Hamadani, the Bulgarian capital of Tarnovo (Qirqin) and the Black Sea port of Anchialos (Qila) were sacked "after great battles", by which Rashid probably means sieges. The identification of Rashid's Qila with Anchialos is recent: it has more often been identified with Chilia on the Danube, but this place was not a city worth attacking at the time. The Andalusian writer Ibn Sa'id al-Maghribi, writing in his Geography in 1250, confirms the Mongol attack on Tarnovo (Arabic Tarnabu). Archaeological evidence of destruction, including coin hoards, that can be dated to 1242 has been found at Červen, Isaccea, Loveč, Nufăru, Preslav, Silistra, Šumen, Svištov, Turcoaia, and Varna, as well as at Tarnovo itself and the island of Păcuiul lui Soare, which was completely destroyed.

On top of the evidence of destruction, there are reports that the tsar's army dealt a defeat to the Mongol army. These accounts reached as far afield as Flanders, where the victory is mentioned in the French chronicle of Philippe Mouskes, and Palestine, where it is mentioned by the Syriac writer Bar Hebraeus. It is unlikely that the Bulgarians scored a victory over anything greater than a small raiding party. Mouskes specifies that "the king of the Vlach country defeated [the Tatars] in a pass", probably Iskar Gorge, the main pass through the Stara Planina, which the Mongols would have probably used in their attack on Constantinople. The tsar in any case was too young to participate in battle and any victory was won by his commanders and is merely being attributed him. The Bulgarian victory can likely be attributed to the mountainous terrain, to which the Mongols were not accustomed.

According to Thomas of Split, before leaving Bulgaria the Mongols massacred their captives—"Hungarians, Slavs and other peoples"—as they had also done in Croatia in March or April.

== Aftermath ==
By 1253, when William of Rubruck visited the Mongol capital, Bulgaria was paying tribute: "from the mouth of [the Don] as far as the Danube everything is theirs [the Mongols']; and even beyond the Danube in the direction of Constantinople [in Vlachia and Little Bulgaria] all pay them tribute; and over and above the tribute stipulated, in recent years they have further levied on each household one axe and all the unwrought iron that has been found." William also says that the Vlach and Bulgarian envoys customarily brought gifts to the court of Sartaq, Batu's son, while on the way to Batu's court. Although no source indicates when the paying of tribute began, it had clearly been in place for years prior to 1253. Modern historians usually link it to the invasion of 1242, although, as Greg Rogers notes, "an explanation for why only Bulgaria, of all the areas traversed by Batu's troops in 1241 and 1242, became enmeshed in the Mongols' tribute system is still lacking in the historical literature."

Some historians believe that Bulgaria escaped major destruction by accepting Mongol suzerainty, while others have argued that the evidence of Mongol raiding is strong enough that there can have been no escaping. In any case, the campaign of 1242 brought the frontier of the authority of the Golden Horde (Batu's command) to the Danube, where it remained for some decades. The Venetian doge and historian Andrea Dandolo, writing a century later, says that the Mongols "occupied" the kingdom of Bulgaria during the 1241–42 campaign.

A series of clashes between the Mongols and the Empire of Constantinople took place in 1242 as the invaders were passing through southern Bulgaria. Bar Hebraeus says specifically that Batu "prepared to attack Constantinople from the quarter of the Bulgarians", although he misdates the event to 1232. By the 1260s, Bulgaria had exchanged Mongol suzerainty for Hungarian. As a result, in the 1270s it was the target of "daily" raiding by the Mongols, according to the Greek historian George Pachymeres.

Bulgaria, as a vassal of the Golden Horde, provided troops to Mengu-Timur's expedition against the Byzantines in Thrace in 1267 and again became a victim of the Golden Horde's incursions in the 1280s. In the 1280s and 1290s, the Golden Horde also established their lordship over Serbia. Bulgaria was still paying tribute into the early second half of the fourteenth century and a considerable part of the Bulgarian kingdom was under direct control of the Chingissid prince Nogai and later the Mongol governors of the Golden Horde.

== Sources ==
- Bretschneider, Emil (1876). Notices of the Mediæval Geography and History of Central and Western Asia: Drawn from Chinese and Mongol Writings, and Compared with the Observations of Western Authors in the Middle Ages. London: Trübner.
- Cahen, Gaston (1924). "Les Mongols dans les Balkans". Revue Historique. 146: 55–59.
- Ciocîltan, Virgil (2012). The Mongols and the Black Sea Trade in the Thirteenth and Fourteenth Centuries. Translated by Samuel Willcocks. Brill.
- Ćirković, Sima (2004). The Serbs. Blackwell Publishing.
- Curta, Florin (2006). Southeastern Europe in the Middle Ages, 500–1250. Cambridge University Press.
- Dimitrov, Hristo (1997). "Über die bulgarisch-ungarischen Beziehungen (1218–1255)". Bulgarian Historical Review. 25 (2–3): 3–27.
- Fine, John V. A. (1987). The Late Medieval Balkans: A Critical Survey from the Late Twelfth Century to the Ottoman Conquest. University of Michigan Press. ISBN 9780472100798.
- Fine, John V. A. (1994). The Late Medieval Balkans: A Critical Survey from the Late Twelfth Century to the Ottoman Conquest. The University of Michigan Press. ISBN 0-472-08260-4.
- Giebfried, John (2013). "The Mongol Invasions and the Aegean World (1241–61)". Mediterranean Historical Review. 28 (2): 129–139. doi:10.1080/09518967.2013.837640. S2CID 162681768.
- Jackson, Peter (2005). The Mongols and the West, 1221–1410. Routledge.
- Korobeinikov, Dimitri (2008). "A Broken Mirror: The Kıpçak World in the Thirteenth Century". In Florin Curta; Roman Kovalev (eds.). The Other Europe in the Middle Ages: Avars, Bulgars, Khazars, and Cumans. Leiden: Brill. pp. 379–412.
- Madgearu, Alexandru (2016). The Asanids: The Political and Military History of the Second Bulgarian Empire (1185–1280). Leiden: Brill.
- Madgearu, Alexandru (2017). The Asanids: The Political and Military History of the Second Bulgarian Empire, 1185–1280. BRILL. ISBN 978-9-004-32501-2.
- Patsch, Carl (1993) [1927]. "Montenegro". In M. T. Houtsma; A. J. Wensinck; E. Lévi-Provençal; H. A. R. Gibb; W. Heffening (eds.). E. J. Brill's First Encyclopaedia of Islam, 1913–1936. Vol. 5. Leiden: Brill. pp. 555–60.
- Lippard, Bruce (1984). The Mongols and Byzantium, 1243–1341 (Ph.D. dissertation). Indiana University.
- Radičević, Dejan (2012). "Medieval Fortifications in Dupljaja and Grebenac". Proceedings of the Regional Conference – Research, Preservation and Presentation of Banat Heritage: Current State and Long Term Strategy. Vršac. pp. 85–88.
- Rogers, Greg S. (1996). "An Examination of Historians' Explanations for the Mongol Withdrawal from East Central Europe". East European Quarterly. 30 (1): 3–26.
- Sophoulis, Panos (2015). "The Mongol Invasion of Croatia and Serbia in 1242". Fragmenta Hellenoslavica. 2: 251–277.
- Sweeney, James Ross (1982). "Thomas of Spalato and the Mongols: a Thirteenth-Century Dalmatian View of Mongol Customs". Florilegium. 4: 156–83. doi:10.3138/flor.4.010.
- Uzelac, Aleksandar (2011). "Tatars and Serbs at the End of the Thirteenth Century". Revista de Istorie Militară (5–6): 9–20.
- Vásáry, István (2005). Cumans and Tatars: Oriental Military in the Pre-Ottoman Balkans, 1185–1365. Cambridge University Press.
