= Niš conspiracy (1821) =

The Niš conspiracy was a failed attempt of a rebellion in Niš in 1821, revealed by the Ottomans the same year. It was led by the Niš Secret Organization, created in 1820 by Orthodox priest Meletius, who was a Greek. It was influenced by the Greek revolutionary organization, Filiki Eteria (Society of Friends). At the end of 1820, the Nis Secret Organization sent its representative to Constantinople, "who was in the patriarchate for 2 to 3 months" as "the envoy of the Bishop of Nis". The muhafiz of the Pashaluk of Niš in 1821 was Husein-paša, who was also the commander of the Niš garrison with 8,000 soldiers. After revealing of the conspiracy by the Ottomans, Father Meletius along with 5 other priests and laity, was hanged on charges of complicity in the Wallachian uprising of 1821.

== See also ==
- Niš Rebellion (1841)

== Sources ==
- Milić, Danica (1983). Istorija Niša: Od najstarijih vremena do oslobođenja od Turaka 1878. godine. Gradina.
- Milićević, Milan (1888). Поменик знаменитих људи у српскога народа новијега доба. Srpska kraljevska štamparija. pp. 443–446. (Public Domain)
- Mirčetić, Dragoljub (1994). Vojna istorija Niša. Vol. 2. Prosveta.
