= Niš rebellion (1841) =

Anti-Ottoman rebellion in 1841

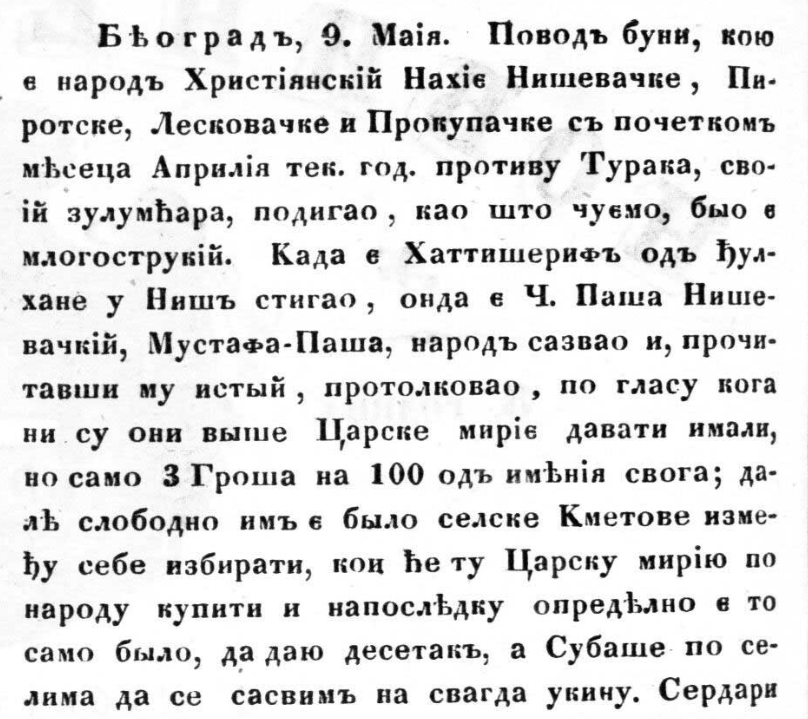
Newspaper "Novine srbske" describing the details of the rebellion taken up by Christian. The non-compliance of the freedoms for the Christians announced in the Edict of Gülhane was the reason for the uprising. Demands for improving the tax system were put forward.

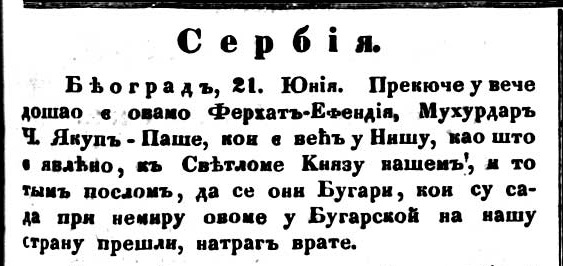
"Novine srbske" describing a mission of Ottoman officials, aiming the returning the Bulgarians who fled in Serbia during the Niš rebellion.

The Niš rebellion (Serbian: Нишка буна; Bulgarian: Нишко въстание) was a short-lived Christian uprising (5–26 April 1841) that broke out in the Ottoman nahiya (sub-districts) of Niš, Pirot, Vranje and Toplica, today in Serbia. At that time, it was known as the Bulgarian revolt. In Serbian historiography it is regarded as a Serbian revolt, while in Bulgarian historiography as a Bulgarian rebellion. (Note: According to Nenad Stefanov, PhD in history at Humboldt University of Berlin, the rebellions between 1836 and 1840 in the area of Niš, Pirot and Belogradčik are object of contention between a nationally centered Serbian and Bulgarian historical narrative, both sides claiming they to be a manifestation of Bulgarian national consciousness or respectively loyalty of the rebels to Miloš Obrenović in a Serbian national historiography. He claims, by conceptualizing the relationship of Obrenović to the rebellion not as the protagonist of any national idea, but as one political actor, acting in this concrete context, is possible to avoid a strictly nationalist views. A lot of sources related to the activity of Prince Miloš, shows his interaction and cooperation with the Ottoman authorities, in order to restrain this revolt. For more see: Revolutions in the Balkans, Revolts and Uprisings in the Era of Nationalism (1804-1908), Panteion University of Social and Political Sciences, Athens, pp. 27-28. and Südosteuropäische Hefte, 3 (2014) 1, pp. 163-166.)

== Rebellion and suppression ==
The rebellion was led by Miloje Jovanović and Nikoča Srndaković Srndak. It was rapid, large and forceful, relatively unexpected by the Ottomans with initial combat successes. Ali Riza, a special commissioner sent to negotiate with the rebels, in a report sent to Istanbul, referred to the Bulgarians who dared intending to achieve supposed independence like that of the Serbs. During the rebellion, the Ottomans burnt down 225 villages.

== Aftermath ==
After the suppression of the rebellion, protests against Ottoman rule continued until September 1842. Around 10,000 people fled to the Principality of Serbia and the Ottoman government appealed for their return. As a result, Miloš Obrenović I of Serbia took a hand in arranging it. Jérôme-Adolphe Blanqui wrote Voyage en Bulgarie (Voyage in Bulgaria), a report of a mission given by French authorities to investigate the real causes of the Niš revolt.

== See also ==
- Battle of Čegar
- Niš conspiracy (1821)
- Bulgarians in Serbia

== Sources ==
- Ekmečić, Milorad (1989). Stvaranje Jugoslavije 1790-1918. Vol. 1. Prosveta. ISBN 9788607004324.
- Milić, Danica (1983). Istorija Niša: Od najstarijih vremena do oslobođenja od Turaka 1878. godine. Gradina.
- Mirčetić, Dragoljub (1994). Vojna istorija Niša. Vol. 2. Prosveta.
- S. Nedeljković (2014). "Сведочење хајдука Ристе Илијића о побуни Срба у Нишком пашалуку 1841. године" (PDF). Мешовита грађа (35). Istorijski institut, Beograd: 93–106.
- Popov, Nil Aleksandrovich (1870). Srbija i Rusija: #. pp. 437–.
- Vladimir Stojančević (1988). Serbia and the Bulgarians, 1804-1878. Просвета.
- Šešum, Uroš S. (2016). "Србија и Стара Србија: (1804-1839)". Универзитет у Београду, Филозофски факултет.
- Nedeljković, Slaviša (2014). "Društveni i agrarno-pravni položaj srpskog naroda u niškom pašaluku u prvim decenijama 19. veka" [Social and agrarian-legal status of the Serbian people in the Niš Pashaluk in the early decades of the 19th century] (PDF). Teme (3): 1349–1363.
- Недељковић, С. "Учешће Арбанаса у гушењу Нишке буне 1841. године. У: С. Недељковић (Прир.)." Устанци и побуне Срба у Турској у XIX векуповодом 170. година од избијања Нишке буне (2012): 7-24.
- Tanzimat ve Sosyal Direnişler Niş İsyanı Üzerine Ayrıntılı Bir İnceleme (1841)
