= 1260 in Ireland =

- Centuries: 11th; 12th; 13th; 14th; 15th
- Decades: 1240s; 1250s; 1260s; 1270s; 1280s
- See also: Other events of 1260; List of years in Ireland

Events from the year 1260 in Ireland.

== Incumbent ==
- Lord: Henry III

== Events ==
- Battle of Down; defeat and death of Brian O’Neill.
- Grey Abbey in County Kildare was founded by William de Vesci. It was run by Franciscan friars.

== Births ==
- Roger Utlagh, or Roger Outlawe (d. 1341) was a leading Irish cleric, judge and statesman of the fourteenth century who held the office of Lord Chancellor of Ireland.

== Deaths ==
- Tadhg Mac Conchubair mic Donncaidh I Briain. His death recorded in Mac Carthaigh's Book as "a fortunate event for the Galls".
