= 1269 in Ireland =

- Centuries: 11th; 12th; 13th; 14th; 15th
- Decades: 1240s; 1250s; 1260s; 1270s; 1280s
- See also: Other events of 1269; List of years in Ireland

Events from the year 1269 in Ireland.

== Incumbent ==
- Lord: Henry III

== Events ==
- Jordan Óge de Exeter became Sheriff of Connacht

== Deaths ==
- Aed Ó Finn, Irish musician
- Donnchadh Cime Mág Samhradháin, chief of the McGovern Clan from 1258 until his murder in 1269
- Íomhaor mac Tighearnán Mág Tighearnán, chief of the McKiernan Clan from 1258 until his death in 1269
