= 1259 in Ireland =

- Centuries: 11th; 12th; 13th; 14th; 15th
- Decades: 1230s; 1240s; 1250s; 1260s; 1270s
- See also: Other events of 1259; List of years in Ireland

Events from the year 1259 in Ireland.

== Incumbent ==
- Lord: Henry III

== Events ==
- The first record of gallowglass service, when Aedh Ó Conchobair, King of Connacht, received a dowry of 160 Scottish warriors from the daughter of Dubhghall mac Ruaidhri, the King of the Hebrides.
- Fromund Le Brun became Lord Chancellor of Ireland
