= 1270 in Ireland =

- Centuries: 11th; 12th; 13th; 14th; 15th
- Decades: 1250s; 1260s; 1270s; 1280s; 1290s
- See also: Other events of 1270; List of years in Ireland

Events from the year 1270 in Ireland.

== Incumbent ==
- Lord: Henry III

== Events ==
- Battle of Áth-an-Chip: The army of the Kingdom of Connacht routs the English army near Carrick-on-Shannon.
- The cathedral on the Rock of Cashel is completed.

== Births ==
- Tanaide Mor mac Dúinnín Ó Maolconaire
