= 1261 in Ireland =

- Centuries: 11th; 12th; 13th; 14th; 15th
- Decades: 1240s; 1250s; 1260s; 1270s; 1280s
- See also: Other events of 1261; List of years in Ireland

Events from the year 1261 in Ireland.

== Incumbent ==
- Lord: Henry III

== Events ==
- Battle of Callann: John fitz Thomas of Desmond and his heir are defeated and killed by Finghin MacCarthy, himself slain later that year.
- Cormac MacCarthy becomes King of Desmond

== Deaths ==
- John FitzThomas FitzGerald, 1st Baron Desmond
