= 1268 in Ireland =

- Centuries: 11th; 12th; 13th; 14th; 15th
- Decades: 1240s; 1250s; 1260s; 1270s; 1280s
- See also: Other events of 1268; List of years in Ireland

This page lists events from the year 1268 in Ireland.

== Incumbent ==
- Lord: Henry III

== Events ==
- The Irish Franciscan friars establish a monastery in Multyfarnham.

== Deaths ==
Conchobar Ó Cellaigh, 43rd King of Uí Maine and 10th Chief of the Name.
