= 1264 in Ireland =

- Centuries: 11th; 12th; 13th; 14th; 15th
- Decades: 1240s; 1250s; 1260s; 1270s; 1280s
- See also: Other events of 1264; List of years in Ireland

Events from the year 1264 in Ireland.

== Incumbent ==
- Lord: Henry III

== Events ==
- The earliest known Irish Parliament met at Castledermot on 18 June.
