= 1271 in Ireland =

- Centuries: 11th; 12th; 13th; 14th; 15th
- Decades: 1250s; 1260s; 1270s; 1280s; 1290s
- See also: Other events of 1271; List of years in Ireland

Events from the year 1271 in Ireland.

== Incumbent ==
- Lord: Henry III

== Deaths ==
- 28 July: Walter de Burgo (b. c 1230) died in Galway and was buried in Athassel Priory
- Maine Mor Ó Cellaigh, King of Uí Maine and 10th Chief of the Name
