= 1281 in Ireland =

- Centuries: 11th; 12th; 13th; 14th; 15th
- Decades: 1260s; 1270s; 1280s; 1290s; 1300s
- See also: Other events of 1281; List of years in Ireland

Events from the year 1281 in Ireland.

== Incumbent ==
- Lord: Edward I

== Events ==
- Battle of Disert-da-chrioch was fought by the Kinel-Connell (led by Hugh Boy, son of Donnell Oge, son of Hugh Meth, son of Hugh, who was usually called an Macaemh Toinleasc, assisted by the English of Ulster) and the Kinel-Owen (led by Donnell Óg O'Donnell.
- Richard Óg de Burgh, 2nd Earl of Ulster begins a war against the Fitzgeralds.
- Hugh, son of Donnell Oge O'Donnell, was inaugurated in the place of his father.
- A battle was fought between the Barretts and the Cusack, in which the Barretts were defeated.
