= 1276 in Ireland =

- Centuries: 11th; 12th; 13th; 14th; 15th
- Decades: 1250s; 1260s; 1270s; 1280s; 1290s
- See also: Other events of 1276; List of years in Ireland

Events from the year 1276 in Ireland.

== Incumbent ==
- Lord: Edward I

== Events ==
- Hereditary lordship of all Thomond is granted to Thomas de Clare.
