= 1258 in Ireland =

- Centuries: 11th; 12th; 13th; 14th; 15th
- Decades: 1230s; 1240s; 1250s; 1260s; 1270s
- See also: Other events of 1258; List of years in Ireland

Events from the year 1258 in Ireland.

== Incumbent ==
- Lord: Henry III

== Events ==
- Meeting at Caol-Uisce on the Erne (near Belleek, County Fermanagh) between Aodh, son of O’Connor, Tadhg, son of O’Brien and Brian O’Neill, self-styled “King of the kings of Ireland”.
- Clane Friary refounded as a house of the Order of Friars Minor Conventual

== Deaths ==
- Jordan d'Exeter, Sheriff of Connacht, was slain in battle by Dubhghall mac Ruaidhrí, a Hebridean king who had plundered a merchant ship in Connacht.
