= 1280 in Ireland =

- Centuries: 11th; 12th; 13th; 14th; 15th
- Decades: 1260s; 1270s; 1280s; 1290s; 1300s
- See also: Other events of 1280; List of years in Ireland

Events from the year 1280 in Ireland.

== Incumbent ==
Lord of Ireland: Edward I of England

== Events ==
Between 1280 and 1285 – Alice Kyteler, a merchant from Kilkenny who later became the subject of a notorious witchcraft prosecution, married her first husband, William Outlaw. The couple had a son, also named William Outlaw.

== Historical context ==
During the late 13th century, Ireland consisted of territories under the authority of the English Crown and territories governed by Gaelic Irish rulers. The English administration, known as the Lordship of Ireland, was under the sovereignty of Edward I of England, who reigned from 1272 to 1307.

Towns such as Dublin and Kilkenny were important centres of commerce and administration. Merchants, landholders and ecclesiastical institutions played significant roles in urban society.

== Incumbent ==
- Lord: Edward I

== Events ==
- Alice Kyteler, alleged witch and the first recorded person condemned for witchcraft in Ireland (d. c 1325) marries first husband William Outlaw between 1280 and 1285.
