= 1259 =

1259 in various calendars
- Gregorian calendar: 1259; MCCLIX
- Ab urbe condita: 2012
- Armenian calendar: 708; ԹՎ ՉԸ
- Assyrian calendar: 6009
- Balinese saka calendar: 1180–1181
- Bengali calendar: 665–666
- Berber calendar: 2209
- English Regnal year: 43 Hen. 3 – 44 Hen. 3
- Buddhist calendar: 1803
- Burmese calendar: 621
- Byzantine calendar: 6767–6768
- Chinese calendar: 戊午年 (Earth Horse); 3956 or 3749 — to — 己未年 (Earth Goat); 3957 or 3750
- Coptic calendar: 975–976
- Discordian calendar: 2425
- Ethiopian calendar: 1251–1252
- Hebrew calendar: 5019–5020
- Hindu calendars
- Vikram Samvat: 1315–1316
- Shaka Samvat: 1180–1181
- Kali Yuga: 4359–4360
- Holocene calendar: 11259
- Igbo calendar: 259–260
- Iranian calendar: 637–638
- Islamic calendar: 656–658
- Japanese calendar: Shōka (era) 3 / Shōgen 1 (正元元年)
- Javanese calendar: 1168–1169
- Julian calendar: 1259; MCCLIX
- Korean calendar: 3592
- Minguo calendar: 653 before ROC 民前653年
- Nanakshahi calendar: −209
- Thai solar calendar: 1801–1802
- Tibetan calendar: ས་ཕོ་རྟ་ལོ་ (male Earth-Horse); 1385 or 1004 or 232 — to — ས་མོ་ལུག་ལོ་ (female Earth-Sheep); 1386 or 1005 or 233

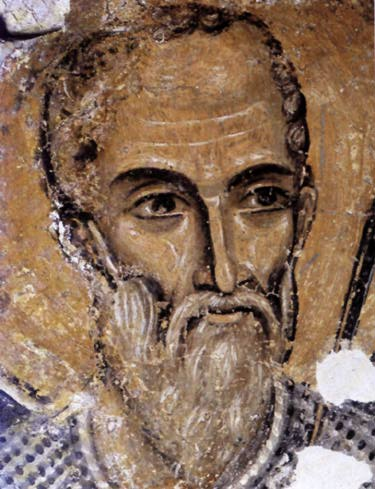
Portion of a fresco of the Boyana Church, completed this year.

Year 1259 (MCCLIX) was a common year starting on Wednesday of the Julian calendar.

== Events ==
=== By place ===
==== Europe ====
- September – Epirote–Nicaean conflict, Battle of Pelagonia: The Empire of Nicaea defeats the Principality of Achaea, ensuring the eventual reconquest of Constantinople in 1261.
- December 4 – Kings Louis IX of France and Henry III of England agree to the Treaty of Paris, in which Henry renounces his claims to French-controlled territory on continental Europe (including Normandy), in exchange for Louis withdrawing his support for English rebels.
- The famous frescoes of the Boyana Church in Bulgaria are completed (the church and its murals are now a UNESCO World Heritage Site).
- The German cities of Lübeck, Wismar, and Rostock enter into a pact to defend against pirates of the Baltic Sea, laying the groundwork for the Hanseatic League.
- Nogai Khan leads the second Mongol Golden Horde attack against Lithuania, and Poland.

==== Asia ====
- March – The Japanese Shōka era ends, and the Shōgen era begins (till April 1260).
- August 11 – While conducting a siege against the Song dynasty city known as Fishing Town in the province of Chongqing, China, the Mongol Great Khan, Möngke Khan, dies in the nearby hills. Persian, Chinese, and Mongol records have different accounts of how he died, including succumbing to an arrow wound received by a Chinese archer in the siege, dysentery, and even a cholera epidemic. His death sparks a succession crisis in the Mongol Empire, while his brothers Ariq Böke and Kublai soon convene their own kurultai to elect themselves as the next Khan of Khans, opening the path to a four–year-long Toluid Civil War from 1260 to 1264. In the end, Ariq Böke surrenders to Kublai.
- While engaged in a war with the Mongols, the Song Chinese official Li Zengbo writes in his Kozhai Zagao, Xugaohou that the city of Qingzhou is manufacturing one to two thousand strong iron-cased gunpowder bomb shells a month, dispatching to Xiangyang and Yingzhou about ten to twenty thousand such bombs at a time.
- Lannathai, a kingdom in the north of Thailand, is founded by King Mangrai.
- The Goryeo Kingdom in Korea surrenders to invading Mongol forces.
- The Chinese era Kaiqing begins and ends, in the Southern Song dynasty of China (Emperor Lizong).

== Births ==
- February 25 – Infanta Branca of Portugal, daughter of King Afonso III of Portugal and Urraca of Castile (d. 1321)
- March 25 – Andronikos II Palaiologos, Byzantine emperor (d. 1332)
- Pietro Cavallini, Italian painter (d. 1330)
- Demetre II of Georgia (d. 1289)
- Richard Óg de Burgh, 2nd Earl of Ulster (d. 1326)

== Deaths ==
- January – Matilda II of Boulogne, ruler of Boulogne, queen consort of Portugal (b. 1202)
- February 7 – Thomas, Count of Flanders
- May 29 – King Christopher I of Denmark (b. 1219)
- July 21 – Gojong of Goryeo
- August 11 – Möngke Khan of the Mongol Empire
- October 7 – Ezzelino III da Romano, Italian ruler
- November 18 – Adam Marsh, English scholar and theologian
- date unknown – Matthew Paris, English chronicler
