= 1257 in Ireland =

- Centuries: 11th; 12th; 13th; 14th; 15th
- Decades: 1230s; 1240s; 1250s; 1260s; 1270s
- See also: Other events of 1257; List of years in Ireland

Events from the year 1257 in Ireland.

== Incumbent ==
- Lord: Henry III

== Events ==
- Death of Maurice Fitzgerald; his lordship of Sligo ravaged by Godfrey O’Donnell, king of Tir Conaill.
- Normans in Thomond were defeated by Conor O’Brien and his son, Tadhg.

A brave battle was fought by Godfrey O'Donnell, Lord of Tirconnell, in defence of his country, with the Lord Justice of Ireland, Maurice Fitzgerald, and the other English nobles of Connacht, at Creadran-Cille in Ros-cede, in the territory of Carbury, to the north of Sligo. A desperate and furious battle was fought between them: bodies were mangled, heroes were disabled, and the senses were stunned on both sides. The field was vigorously maintained by the Kinel-Connell, who made such obstinate and vigorous onsets upon the English that, in the end, they routed them with great slaughter. Godfrey himself, however, was severely wounded; for he met Maurice Fitzgerald face to face in single combat, in which they wounded each other severely. In a consequence of the success of this battle, the English and the Geraldines were driven out of Lower Connacht.

On the same day Mac Griffin, an illustrious knight, was taken prisoner by O'Donnell's people; and Sligo was afterwards burned and totally plundered by them. Donough, the son of Cormac O'Donnell, was killed in the heat of this battle of Creadran. They (O'Donnell's people) then returned home in consequence of O'Donnell's wounds; but, were it not that his wounds had oppressed him, he would have routed his enemies to the River Moy. Godfrey, on his return, prostrated and demolished the castle which had been erected by the English a short time before, at Cael-uisce, to carry on the war against the Kinel-Connell.

Maurice Fitzgerald, for some time Lord Justice of Ireland, and the destroyer of the Irish, died.

== Deaths ==
- Maurice FitzGerald, 2nd Lord of Offaly and founder of the Franciscan Friary of South Abbey, Youghal was founded in 1224
