= 1279 in Ireland =

- Centuries: 11th; 12th; 13th; 14th; 15th
- Decades: 1250s; 1260s; 1270s; 1280s; 1290s
- See also: Other events of 1279; List of years in Ireland

Events from the year 1279 in Ireland.

== Incumbent ==
- Lord: Edward I

== Events ==
- Carmelite Friars arrived in Ireland and settled in Dublin.
- Duarcán mac Íomhaor Mág Tighearnán the Second (anglicised Durcan McKiernan) became chief of the McKiernan Clan and Baron or Lord of Tullyhunco barony, County Cavan
