= Kojiki Uragaki =

Commentary on the Kojiki of unknown authorship and date

The Kojiki Uragaki (古事記裏書) is a one-volume commentary on the Kojiki of unknown authorship and date. It survives in a single manuscript held by the Ise Grand Shrine and produced by a medieval high priest of the shrine. It may show some influence of syncretistic Shingon Buddhism, and is considered an important work in the history of commentary upon the Kojiki.

== Overview ==
The Kojiki Uragaki is a commentary on the Kojiki, an eighth-century work of Shinto historiography and mythology.

== Authorship and date ==
The Kojiki Uragaki is of unknown date and authorship. Several theories as to the author have been proposed, such as Urabe Kanefumi (卜部兼文) and Kitabatake Chikafusa.

The Shinpukuji-bon (真福寺本) of the Kojiki mistakenly identifies the author of the Uragaki as Kanefumi, and its date of composition as the tenth year of Bun'ei (1273).

== Contents ==
The Kojiki Uragaki appears to show the influence the 1381 copy of the Kojiki produced by the Shingon monk Dōka (道果). If this is the case, it would appear to also reflect the philosophy of Shingon Shintō (真言神道, or 叡尊流神道, Eizon-ryū Shintō), a syncretistic form of Shinto influenced by Shingon Buddhism.

It is considered an important work in the history of Kojiki scholarship.

== Textual tradition and modern editions ==
The work survives in a single manuscript that is the basis for all later copies, known as the Dōshō-bon (道祥本) and held in the archives of the Ise Grand Shrine. The manuscript has the title 古事記裏書注之 inscribed on its cover. "Dōshō" was the Dharma name of the high priest (神主 kannushi) of Ise Grand Shrine Arakida Hōkō (荒木田法興), who copied the text and left a copyist's note.

Facsimile editions have been produced by the Koten Hozon-kai (古典保存会, "Society for the Preservation of Classics") and the Ise Grand Shrine Archives (神宮文庫 Jingū Bunko), and modern printed editions have appeared in Shintō Sōsho Vol. 2 (神道叢書2) and in Takashi Tanaka's Nihon Koten no Kenkyū (日本古典の研究).

== Works cited ==
- Onoda, Mitsuo (1983). "Kojiki Uragaki". Nihon Koten Bungaku Daijiten 日本古典文学大辞典 (in Japanese). Vol. 2. Tokyo: Iwanami Shoten. p. 602. OCLC 11917421.
