= Catherina van Holland =

Dutch noble

Catharina van Holland (c. 1280 – after 12 August 1328) was the illegitimate child of Floris V, Count of Holland. She was married to Zweder van Montfoort. Their son was Hendrik II van Montfoort.
