= 1260 =

1260 in various calendars
- Gregorian calendar: 1260; MCCLX
- Ab urbe condita: 2013
- Armenian calendar: 709; ԹՎ ՉԹ
- Assyrian calendar: 6010
- Balinese saka calendar: 1181–1182
- Bengali calendar: 666–667
- Berber calendar: 2210
- English Regnal year: 44 Hen. 3 – 45 Hen. 3
- Buddhist calendar: 1804
- Burmese calendar: 622
- Byzantine calendar: 6768–6769
- Chinese calendar: 己未年 (Earth Goat); 3957 or 3750 — to — 庚申年 (Metal Monkey); 3958 or 3751
- Coptic calendar: 976–977
- Discordian calendar: 2426
- Ethiopian calendar: 1252–1253
- Hebrew calendar: 5020–5021
- Hindu calendars
- Vikram Samvat: 1316–1317
- Shaka Samvat: 1181–1182
- Kali Yuga: 4360–4361
- Holocene calendar: 11260
- Igbo calendar: 260–261
- Iranian calendar: 638–639
- Islamic calendar: 658–659
- Japanese calendar: Shōgen 2 / Bun'ō 1 (文応元年)
- Javanese calendar: 1169–1170
- Julian calendar: 1260; MCCLX
- Korean calendar: 3593
- Minguo calendar: 652 before ROC 民前652年
- Nanakshahi calendar: −208
- Thai solar calendar: 1802–1803
- Tibetan calendar: ས་མོ་ལུག་ལོ་ (female Earth-Sheep); 1386 or 1005 or 233 — to — ལྕགས་ཕོ་སྤྲེ་ལོ་ (male Iron-Monkey); 1387 or 1006 or 234

The Cathedral of Chartres is dedicated.

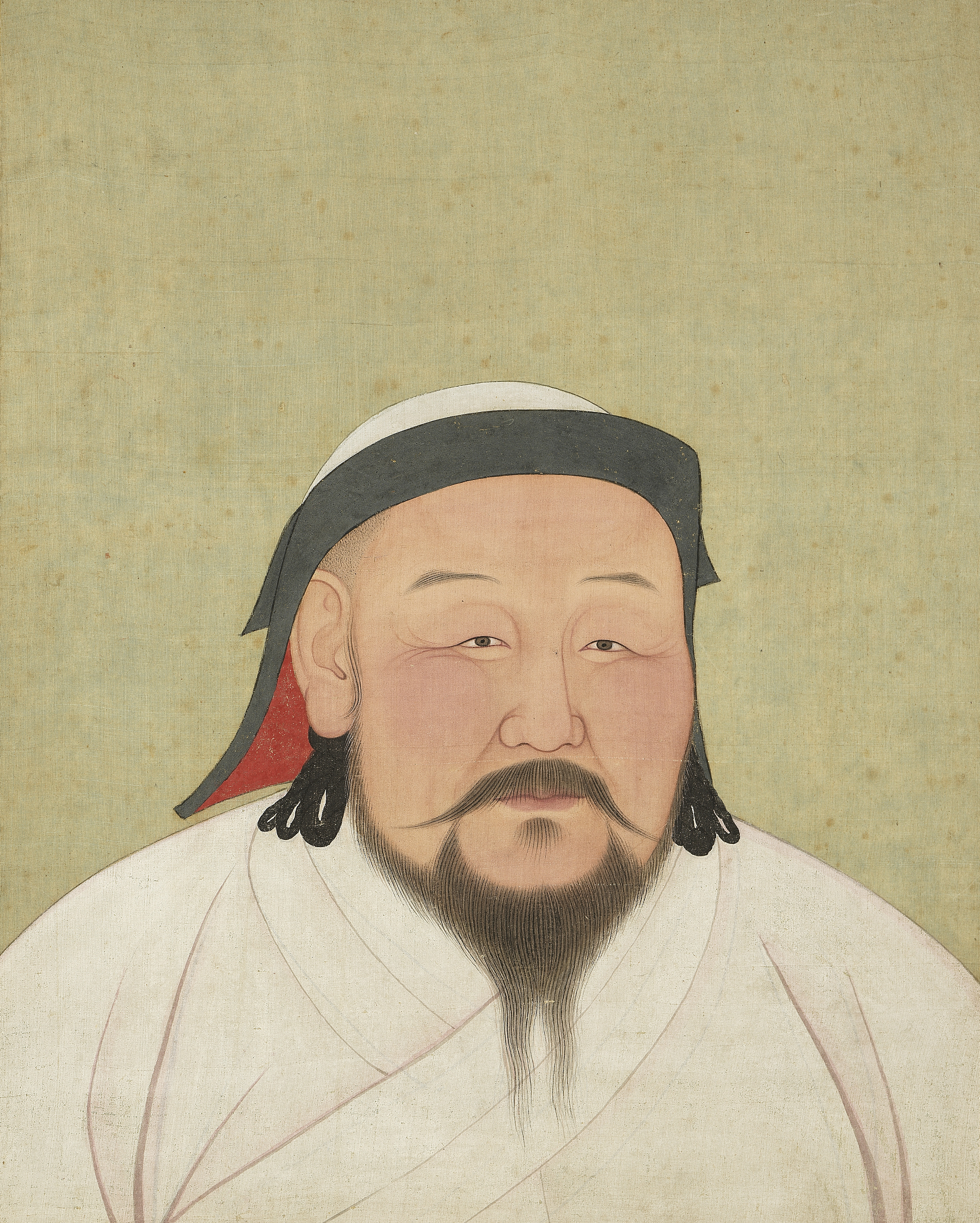
Kublai Khan becomes ruler of the Mongol Empire.

Livonia in 1260

Year 1260 (MCCLX) was a leap year starting on Thursday of the Julian calendar.

== Events ==
=== By place ===
==== Africa ====
- October 24 – Saif ad-Din Qutuz, Mamluk sultan of Egypt, is assassinated by Baibars, who seizes power for himself.
- The civil servant and bard longing for lost al-Andalus, Ibn al-Abbar, is burnt at the stake by the Marinid ruler.
- The Arba'a Rukun Mosque is completed in Mogadishu. The Arba'a Rukun Mosque (Arabic: أربع ركون), also known as Arba Rucun, is a mosque in the medieval district Shangani, Mogadishu, Somalia.

==== Asia ====
- April – The Japanese Shōgen era ends, and the Bun'ō era begins (to February 1261).
- May 5 – Kublai Khan becomes a claimant to the Mongol Empire, after the death of Möngke Khan.
- The Toluid Civil War begins between Kublai Khan and Ariq Böke, for the title of Great Khan.
- May 21 – Kublai sends his envoy Hao Jing to negotiate with Song dynasty Chancellor Jia Sidao, after the small force left by Kublai south of the Yangtze River is destroyed, by a Chinese army of the Southern Song dynasty. Chancellor Jia Sidao imprisons the entire embassy of Kublai. This slight will not be forgotten by Kublai, but he is unable to assault the Song, due to the civil war with his rival brother Ariq Böke.
- September 3 – Battle of Ain Jalut in Galilee: The Egyptians defeat the Mongols, marking their first decisive defeat, and the point of maximum expansion of the Mongol Empire.
- The Chinese era Jingding begins and ends in 1264 in the Southern Song dynasty of China (last era of Emperor Lizong).

==== Europe ====
- July 12 – Battle of Kressenbrunn: King Ottokar II of Bohemia captures Styria from King Béla IV of Hungary.
- July 13 – Livonian Crusade: The Baltic Samogitians and Curonians of the Grand Duchy of Lithuania decisively defeat the Livonian Order in the Battle of Durbe. This leads the Estonians of Saaremaa Island to once again rebel against the Livonian Order.
- September 4 – Battle of Montaperti: The Sienese Ghibellines, supported by the forces of King Manfred of Sicily, defeat the Florentine Guelphs.
- September 20 – Second of the two major Prussian uprisings by the Old Prussian tribe of Balts against the Teutonic Order begins.
- The Duchy of Saxony is divided into Saxony-Lauenberg and Saxony-Wittenberg, marking the end of the first Saxon state.
- War breaks out in the Valais (in modern-day Switzerland), as the Bishopry of Sion defends against an invasion by the County of Savoy.
- Croatia is divided into two sub-regions ruled by ban: the Croatian region on the south and Slavonian region on the north, by King Béla IV of Hungary.

=== By topic ===
==== Arts and culture ====
- October 24 – The Cathedral of Chartres is dedicated in the presence of King Louis IX of France (the cathedral is now a UNESCO World Heritage Site).
- Jacobus de Voragine compiles his work, the Golden Legend, a late medieval best-seller.
- The mosaic Christ between the Virgin and St Minias is made on the facade of Florence's Basilica di San Miniato al Monte.
- German musical theorist Franco of Cologne publishes Ars Cantus Mensurabilis, in which he advances a new theory of musical notation, in which the length of a musical note is denoted by the shape of that note, a system still used today.
- Construction begins on the Dunkeld Cathedral in Perthshire, Scotland.
- Construction begins on the cathedrals at Meißen and Schwerin.
- Nicola Pisano sculpts the pulpit in the Pisa Baptistery.

==== Religion ====
- The newly formed Sukhothai Kingdom of Thailand adopts Theravada Buddhism.
- The advent of the Age of the Holy Spirit predicted by Joachim of Fiore, according to his interpretation of the Book of Revelation, chapter 6.

== Births ==
- May 15 or July 25 – John of Castile, Lord of Valencia de Campos (d. 1319)
- August 2 – Kyawswa of Pagan, last ruler of the Pagan Kingdom (d. 1299)
- approximate date
  - Enguerrand de Marigny, minister to King Philip IV of France
  - Fatima bint al-Ahmar, Nasrid princess in the Emirate of Granada (d. 1349)
  - Henry de Cobham, 1st Baron Cobham (d. 1339)
  - Matthew III Csák, Hungarian oligarch
  - Meister Eckhart, German theologian, philosopher and mystic (d. 1328)
  - Guillaume de Nogaret, keeper of the seal to King Philip IV of France (d. 1313)
  - Maximus Planudes, Byzantine grammarian and theologian (approximate date; d. 1330)
  - Khutulun, Mongol princess and warrior (d. 1306)

== Deaths ==
- April 28 – Luchesius Modestini, founding member of the Third Order of St. Francis
- May – Marie of Brabant, Holy Roman Empress, wife of Otto IV, Holy Roman Emperor (alternative date is June)
- August 9 – Walter of Kirkham, Bishop of Durham
- October 12 – Thorkill, Bishop of Reval.
- October 24 – Saif ad-Din Qutuz, Mamluk sultan of Egypt
- December 4 – Aymer de Valence, Bishop of Winchester (b. 1222)
- date unknown
  - Kitbuqa, Mongol military leader (executed)
  - Sicko Sjaerdema, ruler of Friesland
  - Ibn al-Abbar, Andalusian diplomat and scholar (b. 1199)
- probable – Franciscus Accursius, Italian jurist
