= 1261 =

1261 in various calendars
- Gregorian calendar: 1261; MCCLXI
- Ab urbe condita: 2014
- Armenian calendar: 710; ԹՎ ՉԺ
- Assyrian calendar: 6011
- Balinese saka calendar: 1182–1183
- Bengali calendar: 667–668
- Berber calendar: 2211
- English Regnal year: 45 Hen. 3 – 46 Hen. 3
- Buddhist calendar: 1805
- Burmese calendar: 623
- Byzantine calendar: 6769–6770
- Chinese calendar: 庚申年 (Metal Monkey); 3958 or 3751 — to — 辛酉年 (Metal Rooster); 3959 or 3752
- Coptic calendar: 977–978
- Discordian calendar: 2427
- Ethiopian calendar: 1253–1254
- Hebrew calendar: 5021–5022
- Hindu calendars
- Vikram Samvat: 1317–1318
- Shaka Samvat: 1182–1183
- Kali Yuga: 4361–4362
- Holocene calendar: 11261
- Igbo calendar: 261–262
- Iranian calendar: 639–640
- Islamic calendar: 659–660
- Japanese calendar: Bun'ō 2 / Kōchō 1 (弘長元年)
- Javanese calendar: 1170–1171
- Julian calendar: 1261; MCCLXI
- Korean calendar: 3594
- Minguo calendar: 651 before ROC 民前651年
- Nanakshahi calendar: −207
- Thai solar calendar: 1803–1804
- Tibetan calendar: ལྕགས་ཕོ་སྤྲེ་ལོ་ (male Iron-Monkey); 1387 or 1006 or 234 — to — ལྕགས་མོ་བྱ་ལོ་ (female Iron-Bird); 1388 or 1007 or 235

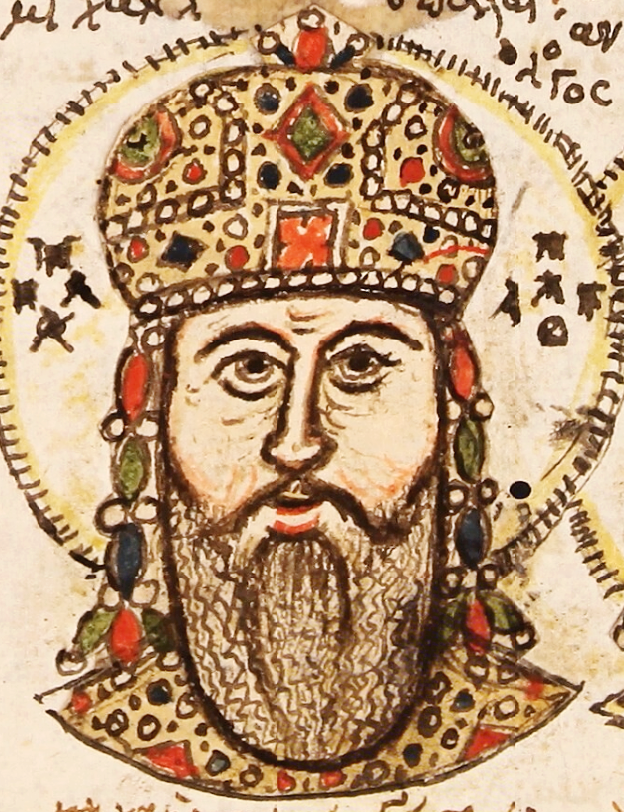
Michael VIII Palaiologos (1223–1282)

Year 1261 (MCCLXI) was a common year starting on Saturday of the Julian calendar.

== Events ==
=== By place ===
==== Byzantine Empire ====
- March 13 – Treaty of Nymphaeum: Emperor Michael VIII Palaiologos signs a trade and defense agreement with the Republic of Genoa, to counterweight the Venetian presence in the region. Genoa agrees to ally with the Empire of Nicaea, by providing a fleet of up to 50 galleys during the projected Nicaean siege of Constantinople, while 16 galleys are to be immediately sent against the Latin Empire.
- July – Michael sends his general Alexios Strategopoulos with a small advance force of 800 soldiers, most of them Cumans, to keep watch on the Bulgarians and scout the defending positions of the Latin forces in the surroundings of Constantinople. When they reach the village of Selymbria, Strategopoulos is informed by local farmers that the entire Latin garrison and the Venetian fleet, are absent conducting a raid against the Nicaean island of Daphnousia. He decides not to lose such a golden opportunity and makes plans (without the consent of Michael) to retake the capital.
- July 25 – Reconquest of Constantinople: Alexios Strategopoulos and his men hide at a monastery near the city gates, before entering through a secret passage. After a short struggle, the guards who are completely taken by surprise are killed and the Venetian quarter is set ablaze. Panic spreads through the capital and Emperor Baldwin II rushes out to save his life, evacuating along with many other Latins with the help of the Venetian fleet. Baldwin manages to escape to the still Latin-held parts of Greece, but Constantinople is lost for good.
- August 15 – Michael enters Constantinople in triumph and is crowned as emperor of the Byzantine Empire at the Hagia Sophia. To solidify his claim, the legitimate ruler, John IV Laskaris, is blinded on Michael's orders on December 25, his 11th birthday. Michael banishes him to a monastery and marries his two sisters to lesser Latin and Bulgarian nobles in an attempt to wipe out the Laskarid dynasty.

==== Mongol Empire ====
- Kublai Khan releases 75 Chinese merchants who were captured along the border of the Mongol Empire. By doing this, Kublai hopes to bolster his popularity and depend on the cooperation of his Chinese subjects to ensure that his army receives more resources.

==== Egypt ====
- February 8 – Egyptian politician Bahaa el-Din bin Hanna appointed Vizier of Egypt for the third term that will last until April 1278.

==== Levant ====
- June 13 – Al-Mustansir II becomes the first Abbasid ruler in Cairo (after his escape during the Siege of Baghdad). He is sent with an Egyptian army by Sultan Baibars to recover Baghdad, but is killed in a Mongol ambush near Anbar (modern Iraq), on November 28. The Abbasid caliphs continue as ceremonial religious figureheads for the Egyptian Mamluks in Egypt until the 16th century.

==== British Isles ====
- June 12 – King Henry III of England obtains a papal bull to absolve himself from his oath to maintain the Provisions of Oxford. He hires an army of 300 French knights as a bodyguard and takes up position in the Tower of London. He dismisses the baronial officials (led by Simon de Montfort) who wish the royal power to be modified by the principle of representation. This sets the stage for the Second Barons' War.
- August – Battle of Callann in Ireland: Norman forces under John FitzThomas are defeated by a Gaelic army led by King Fínghin Mac Carthaigh. John FitzGerald is killed during the fighting.

==== Asia ====
- February – The Japanese Bun'ō era ends and the Kōchō era begins during the reign of the 11-year-old Emperor Kameyama (until 1264).

=== By topic ===
==== Education ====
- Early – Following disputes, northern academics from the University of Cambridge in England set up a University of Northampton by royal charter but it is suppressed by the Crown in 1265.

==== Literature ====
- The earliest extant Chinese illustration of "Pascal's Triangle" is from Yang Hui's (or Qianguang's) book Xiangjie Jiuzhang Suanfa, published this year.

==== Religion ====
- May 25 – Pope Alexander IV dies after a pontificate of 6-years at Viterbo. He is succeeded by Urban IV as the 182nd pope of the Catholic Church.
- August 29 – Urban IV offers the crown of Sicily to Charles of Anjou, youngest son of King Louis VIII of France, hoping to strengthen his position.
- Wurmsbach Abbey (located in Bollingen) is established by Count Rudolf V of Rapperswil in Switzerland.

== Births ==
- February 1 – Walter de Stapledon, English bishop of Exeter (d. 1326)
- February 11 – Otto III, Duke of Bavaria, king of Hungary and Croatia (d. 1312)
- February 28 – Margaret of Scotland, queen consort of Norway (d. 1283)
- March 1 – Hugh Despenser the Elder, English chief adviser (d. 1326)
- July 25 – Arthur II, Breton nobleman (House of Dreux) (d. 1312)
- October 9 – Denis I ("the Poet King"), king of Portugal (d. 1325)
- Abu Abdallah ibn al-Hakim, Andalusian vizier and poet (d. 1309)
- November – 'Ala' al-Dawla Simnani, Persian Sufi mystic and writer (d. 1336)
- Albertino Mussato, Paduan statesman, poet and chronicler (d. 1329)
- Constantine Palaiologos, Byzantine prince and general, son of Michael VIII (d. 1306)
- Daniel of Moscow (Aleksandrovich), Russian prince (d. 1303)
- Zangpo Pal, Tibetan religious leader (d. 1323)
- Elizabeth of Sicily, queen consort of Hungary (House of Anjou) (d. 1303)
- Konoe Iemoto, Japanese nobleman (kugyō) and regent (d. 1296)
- Pier Saccone Tarlati di Pietramala, Italian nobleman and condottiero (d. 1356)
- Władysław I Łokietek ("Elbow-High"), king of Poland (d. 1333)

== Deaths ==
- February 28 – Henry III ("the Good"), duke of Brabant (b. 1230)
- April 1 – Ahi Evran, Bektashi Sufi preacher and poet (b. 1169)
- May 25 – Alexander IV, pope of the Catholic Church (b. 1199)
- July 8 – Adolf IV of Holstein, German nobleman (House of Schaumburg)
- July 25 – Nicephorus II of Constantinople, Byzantine patriarch
- August – John FitzThomas, 1st Baron Desmond, Norman Irish nobleman, killed in battle
- August 24 – Ela of Salisbury, English noblewoman (b. 1187)
- September 18 – Konrad von Hochstaden, German archbishop
- September 22/27 – Plaisance of Antioch, queen consort of Cyprus (b. 1235)
- October 27 – Sancho of Castile, Spanish archbishop (b. 1233)
- November 2 – Bettisia Gozzadini, Bolognese noblewoman and academic lawyer (b. 1209)
- November 9 – Sanchia of Provence, Queen of the Romans, German queen consort (b. 1225)
- November 26 – Hōjō Shigetoki, Japanese samurai (b. 1198)
- November 27 – Athanasius III of Alexandria, Egyptian pope
- November 28 – Al-Mustansir II, Abbasid ruler (caliph) of Cairo, killed
- Abu Bakr Ibn Sayyid al-Nās, Andalusian theologian (b. 1200)
- An-Nasir Dawud, Kurdish ruler, Ayyubid ruler (emir) of Damascus (b. 1206)
- Benedict II of Esztergom, Hungarian chancellor, governor and archbishop
- Conrad I, Burgrave of Nuremberg ("the Pious"), German nobleman and knight (b. 1186)
- Qin Jiushao, Chinese mathematician and writer (b. 1202)
- Sayf al-Din Bakharzi, Persian poet and sheikh (b. 1190)
- Stephen of Bourbon, French Dominican preacher (b. 1180)
