= 1286 in Ireland =

- Centuries: 11th; 12th; 13th; 14th; 15th
- Decades: 1260s; 1270s; 1280s; 1290s; 1300s
- See also: Other events of 1286; List of years in Ireland

Events from the year 1286 in Ireland.

== Incumbent ==
- Lord: Edward I

== Events ==
The Turnberry Band agreement was signed in support of Robert the Bruce.

== Deaths ==
- 10 November - Maurice FitzGerald, 3rd Lord of Offaly
- Cathal Ó Madadhan, King of Síol Anmchadha
