= Johannes de Beke =

Johannes de Beke (also Johannes de Beka or Jan Beke) was a 14th-century Dutch priest and historian. He was probably a monk of Egmond Abbey. In 1346, he wrote a Latin Chronographia of the County of Holland and Diocese of Utrecht from the time of the Roman Empire down to his time. He dedicated it to Bishop Jan van Arkel and Count William I. His stated aim was to preserve the peace between counts and bishops by demonstrating the common origin and shared history of their territories.

Johannes's sources include earlier annals and the Rhyming Chronicle of Melis Stoke. Continuations were added to his Chronographia to bring it down to 1393. In 1395, a Middle Dutch translation was made, to which continuations were added down to 1430. The continuations are an important contemporary source for Dutch history.
