= Bun'ō =

Period of Japanese history (1260–1261 CE)

Bun'ō (文応) was a Japanese era name (年号, nengō; lit. "year name") after Shōka and before Kōchō. This period spanned the years from April 1260 to February 1261. The reigning emperor was Kameyama-tennō (亀山天皇).

== Change of era ==
- 1260 Bun'ō gannen (文応元年): The new era name was created to mark an event or a number of events. The years of the Shōgen era were part of a period marked by famine and epidemics; and the era name was changed in quick succession in the hope that this might bring them to a close. The previous era ended and a new one commenced in Shōka 3.

== Events of the Bun'ō era ==
- 1260 (Bun'ō 1): Crop failures brought widespread starvation.
- 1260 (Bun'ō 1): Nichiren preached in the streets of Kamakura.
- July 16, 1260 (Bun'ō 1, 7th day of the 6th month): Nichiren submitted a formal remonstrance to Hojo Tokiyori; this was the "Treatise on Securing Peace in the Land through the Establishment of True Buddhism" (Rissho Ankoku Ron)
- 1260 (Bun'ō 1): Buddhism was introduced from Japan to the Ryūkyū Kingdom.
- 1260 (Bun'ō 1): The rise of pirates and increased raids from safe havens in Tsushima began to develop into a major problem.

== Notes ==
Preceded by Shōgen	Era or nengō Bun'ō; 1260–1261	Succeeded by Kōchō
