= Shōka (era) =

Period of Japanese history (1257–1259 CE)

Shōka (正嘉) was a Japanese era name (年号, nengō, lit. "year name") after Kōgen and before Shōgen. This period spanned the years from March 1257 to March 1259. The reigning emperor was Go-Fukakusa-tennō (後深草天皇).

== Change of era ==
- 1257 Shōka gannen (正嘉元年): The new era name was created to mark an event or a number of events. The previous era ended and a new one commenced in Kōgen 2.

== Events of the Shōka era ==
- 1257 (Shōka 1): A major epidemic.

== Notes ==
Preceded by Kōgen	Era or nengō Shōka; 1257–1259	Succeeded by Shōgen
