= Aed Ó Finn =

Aed Ó Finn was a 13th century Irish musician. His obituary, sub anno 1269, records that he was a "master of music and minstrelsy".
