= Floris V of Holland =

Count of Holland from 1256 to 1296

Floris V
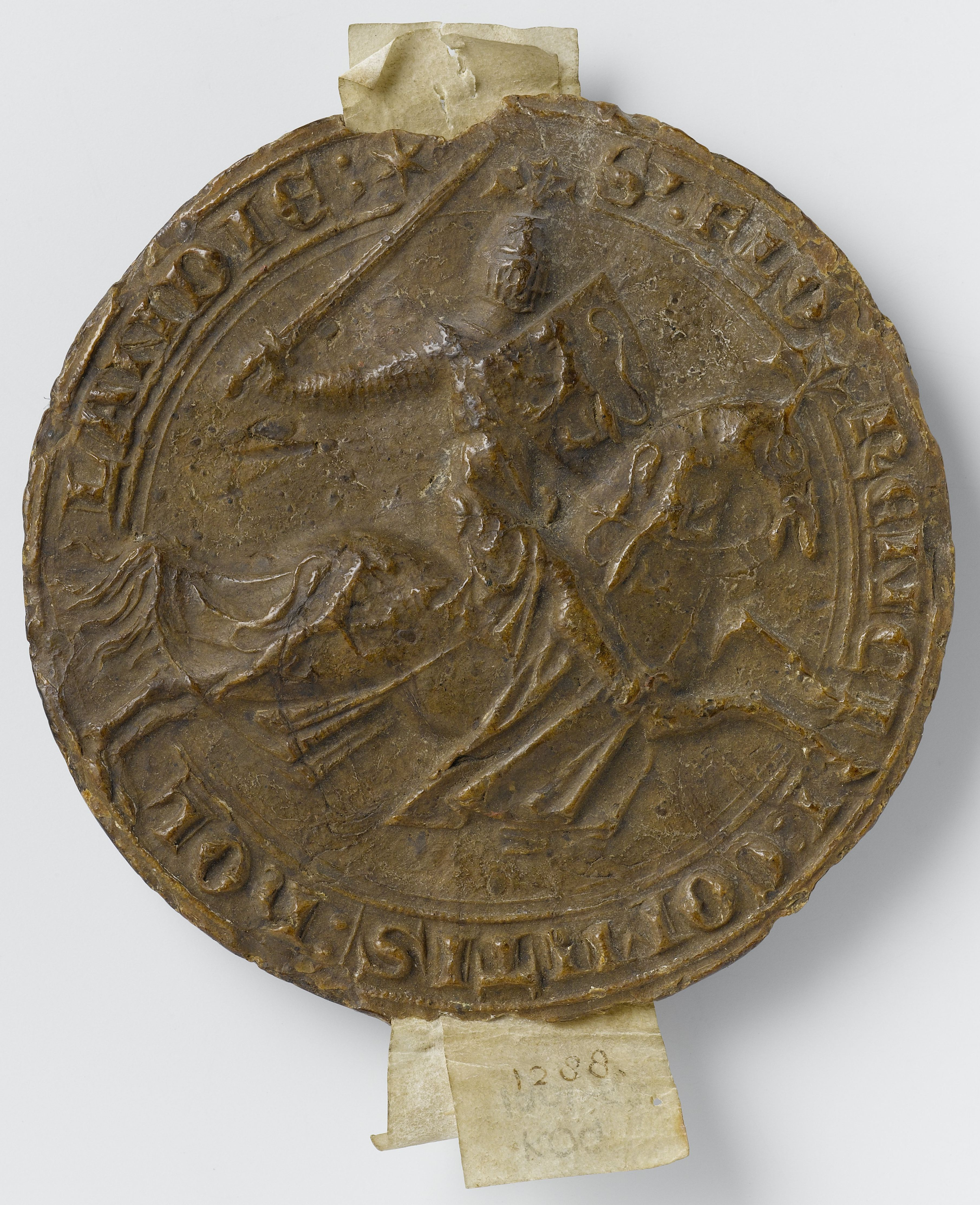
- Effigy of Floris V on his seal

Count of Holland and Zeeland
- Reign: 1256–1296
- Predecessor: William II
- Successor: John I
- Born: 24 June 1254; Leiden
- Died: 27 June 1296 (aged 42); Muiderberg
- Buried: Rijnsburg Abbey
- Noble family: House of Holland
- Spouse: Beatrice of Flanders
- Issue more...: John I, Count of Holland; Witte van Haemstede; Catherina van Holland
- Father: William II, Count of Holland
- Mother: Elisabeth of Brunswick-Lüneburg

Floris V (24 June 1254 – 27 June 1296) reigned as Count of Holland and Zeeland from 1256 until 1296. His life was documented in detail in the Rijmkroniek by Melis Stoke, his chronicler. He is credited with a mostly peaceful reign, modernizing administration, policies beneficial to trade, generally acting in the interests of his peasants at the expense of nobility, and reclaiming land from the sea. His dramatic murder, said by some to have been arranged by King Edward I of England and Guy, Count of Flanders, made him a hero in Holland.

== Early life ==
Floris was the son of Count William II (1227–1256) and Elisabeth of Brunswick-Lüneburg. His father was slain in 1256 by Frisians when Floris was just two years old. Custody over Floris fell first to his uncle (Floris de Voogd from 1256 to 1258), then to his aunt (Adelaide of Holland from 1258 to 1263). The fight over custody of Holland culminated in the battle of Reimerswaal on 22 January 1263, where Count Otto II of Guelders defeated Aleidis and was chosen regent by the nobles who opposed Aleidis.

Otto II served as Floris V's guardian until he was twelve years old (1266) and considered capable of administering Holland himself. Floris's mother, Elisabeth, continued to reside in Holland after her husband's death in 1256. She died on 27 May 1266 and is buried in Middelburg abbey church. She died in the same year that Count Floris V was declared old enough to rule without guardianship, on 10 July 1266.

== Political life ==
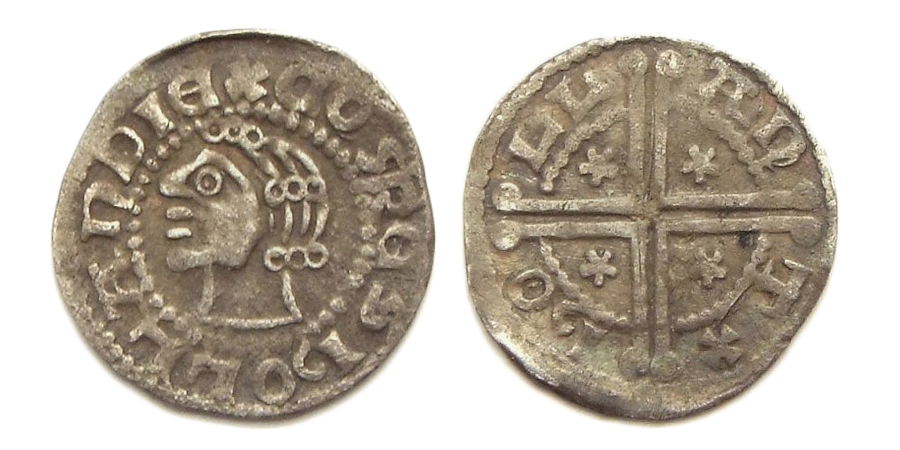
Holland, penny or 'kopje' with portrait of Floris V

Floris was supported by the count of Hainaut of the house of Avesnes, who was an arch-enemy of the count of Flanders of the house of Dampierre. Floris married Beatrix of Dampierre, the daughter of Guy of Dampierre, count of Flanders, in 1269.

In 1272, Floris unsuccessfully attacked the Frisians (culminating in the Battle of Heiloo) in a first attempt to retrieve the body of his father. In 1274 he faced an uprising by nobles led by the powerful lords Gijsbrecht IV of Amstel, Zweder of Abcoude, Arnoud of Amstel, and Herman VI van Woerden, who held lands on the border with the adjacent bishopric of Utrecht (the area of Amsterdam, Abcoude, IJsselstein, and Woerden) at the expense of the bishop. Gijsbrecht and Herman were supported by the craftsmen of Utrecht, the peasants of Kennemerland (Alkmaar, Haarlem, and surroundings), Waterland (north of Amsterdam) and Amstelland (Amsterdam and surroundings) and the West Frisians. He assisted the weak bishop, John I of Nassau, by making a treaty with the craftsmen. The bishop would become dependent on Holland's support, and eventually added the lands of the rebellious lords to Holland in 1279. He gave concessions to the peasants of Kennemerland. Kennemerland was a duneland, where the farmers had far fewer rights than the farmers in the polders. Floris got rid of the Avesnes influence and switched allegiance to the Dampierres.

In 1282, Floris again attacked the troublesome Frisians in the north, defeating them at the battle of Vronen, and succeeded in retrieving the body of his father. After a campaign in 1287–1288, he finally defeated the Frisians. In the meantime, he had received Zeeland-bewester-Schelde (the area that controls access to the Scheldt river) as a loan from the Holy Roman King Rudolf I of Germany in 1287, but the local nobility sided with the count of Flanders, who invaded in 1290. Floris arranged a meeting with Count Guy of Flanders, but he was taken prisoner in Biervliet and was forced to abandon his claims and then set free.

Floris immediately wanted to resume war, but King Edward I of England, who had an interest in access to the great rivers for wool and other English goods, convinced Floris to stop hostilities with Flanders. When in 1292 Floris claimed the throne of Scotland in the Great Cause (his great-grandmother Ada being the sister of King William I of Scotland), he did not receive the expected support from Edward, but England did support his claims in a new, this time more successful, war in Flanders.

== Capture and death ==
Amid the Gascon War between England and France, Edward I moved his trade in wool from Dordrecht in Holland to Mechelen in Brabant to aid Flanders in its own war against France. Floris then switched sides to France in 1296. Edward I subsequently prohibited all English trade with Holland and conspired with Guy of Flanders to have Floris kidnapped and taken to France. The humiliated lords Gijsbrecht IV of Amstel and Herman of Woerden, together with Gerard van Velsen, captured Floris during a hunting party and brought him to Muiderslot castle. The news of the capture spread quickly; afraid of the people, four days later, the lords, together with their captive, left the castle to get to a safer place. They were stopped by an angry mob of local peasants. In panic, Gerard of Velzen killed the count, and the lords fled. Gerard was eventually captured and killed in Leiden. The other conspirators fled to Brabant, Flanders and perhaps to Prussia, to which many colonists and crusaders from Holland migrated.

== Legacy ==
The life and death of Floris V inspired songs, plays, and books in the Netherlands. Best known is the play Gijsbrecht van Aemstel by 17th-century playwright and poet Joost van den Vondel, which is about the sacking of Amsterdam in the days after the death of Floris V.

The nickname "God of the Peasants" was introduced after Floris' death in the nobility and was originally intended to be an insult. He earned the name because he behaved "as if he were the Good Lord himself with his peasants". He apparently knighted 40 peasants as members of the Order of St. James without permission of the church, provoking the anger of the church and of the 12 existing noble members of that knightly order. This story has no historical basis, just like another story that claims that Gerard of Velzen participated in the conspiracy because Floris supposedly raped his wife. What is certain is that Floris was remembered as a saint by the peasants of Holland and that the "God of the Peasants" became a symbolic hero in the struggle for independence from Spain in the Eighty Years' War (1568–1648).

== Family ==
Coat of arms of Holland

Floris V was the son of Count William II of Holland and Elisabeth of Brunswick-Lüneburg. In c. 1271, Floris married Beatrice of Flanders, daughter of Guy de Dampierre, count of Flanders and Matilda, heiress of Bethune, Dendermonde, Richebourg and Warneton. Floris and Beatrice had several children including:

- John I, Count of Holland, who married Elizabeth, daughter of King Edward I of England. No issue. After John's death, Elizabeth returned to England and married Humphrey de Bohun, 4th Earl of Hereford.
- Margaret, engaged to Alphonso, Earl of Chester, son of King Edward I of England, from 1281 to his death in 1284.

Floris had several illegitimate children, including:

- Witte van Haemstede (c. 1281–1321), son of Anna van Heusden (daughter of Jan van Heusden). Married Agnes van der Sluys had issue.
- Catherina van Holland (Katherin) (c. 1280- after 1328), married Zweder van Montfoort

== Sources ==
- Fegley, Randall (2002). The Golden Spurs of Kortrijk: How the Knights of France Fell to the Foot Soldiers of Flanders in 1302. McFarland & Co. ISBN 0786480548.
- Pollock, M. A. (2015). Scotland, England and France After the Loss of Normandy, 1204-1296. The Boydell Press.

Floris V of Holland House of Holland Born: 24 June 1254 Died: 27 June 1296
Preceded by William II	Count of Holland and Zeeland; 1256–1296	Succeeded by John I
