= Kōchō =

Period of Japanese history (1261–1264 CE)

Kōchō 弘長
- February 1261 – February 1264
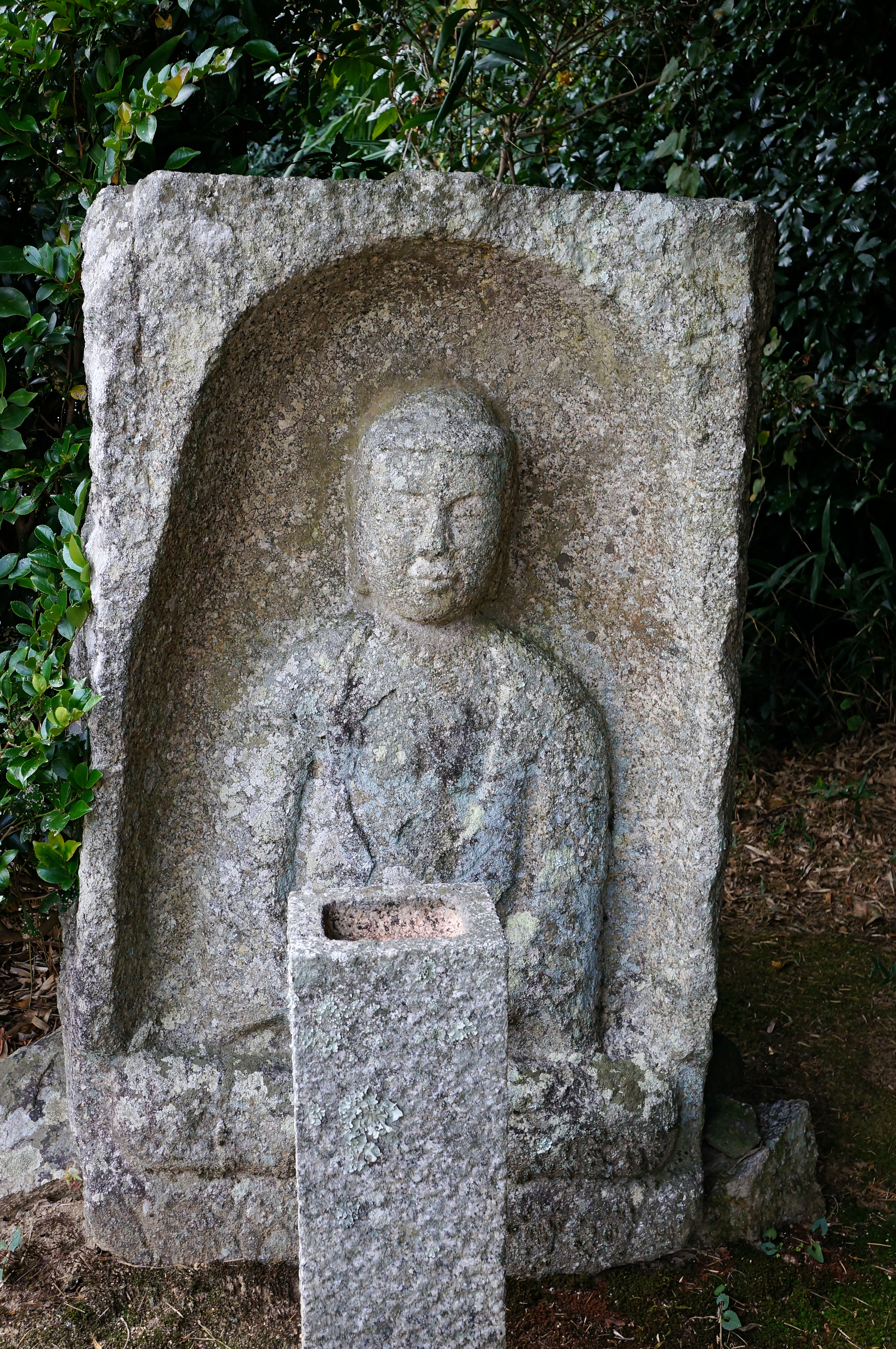
- Sculpture in Kizugawa, Kyoto dated to 1262.
- Location: Japan
- Monarch(s): Emperor Kameyama

Kōchō (弘長) was a Japanese era name (年号, nengō, lit. "year name") after Bun'ō and before Bun'ei. This period spanned the years from February 1261 to February 1264. The reigning emperor was Kameyama-tennō (亀山天皇).

== Change of era ==
- Kōchō gannen (弘長元年); 1261: The new era name was created to mark an event or a number of events. The previous era ended and a new one commenced in Bun'ō 2. The era name comes from The Political Program of the Zhenguan Period and combines the characters 弘 ("broad") and 長 ("long").

== Events of the Kōchō era ==
- June 11, 1261 (Kōchō 1, 12th day of the 5th month): Nichiren was exiled to Itō in the Izu Province.
- March 19, 1262 (Kōchō 2, 28th day of the 11th month): Shinran passes away at the age of 90
- April 1, 1263 (Kōchō 3, 22nd day of the 2nd month): Nichiren was pardoned.

== Notes ==
| Preceded by Bun'ō | Era or nengō Kōchō; 1261–1264 | Succeeded by Bun'ei |
