= Melis Stoke =

13th-century Dutch writer

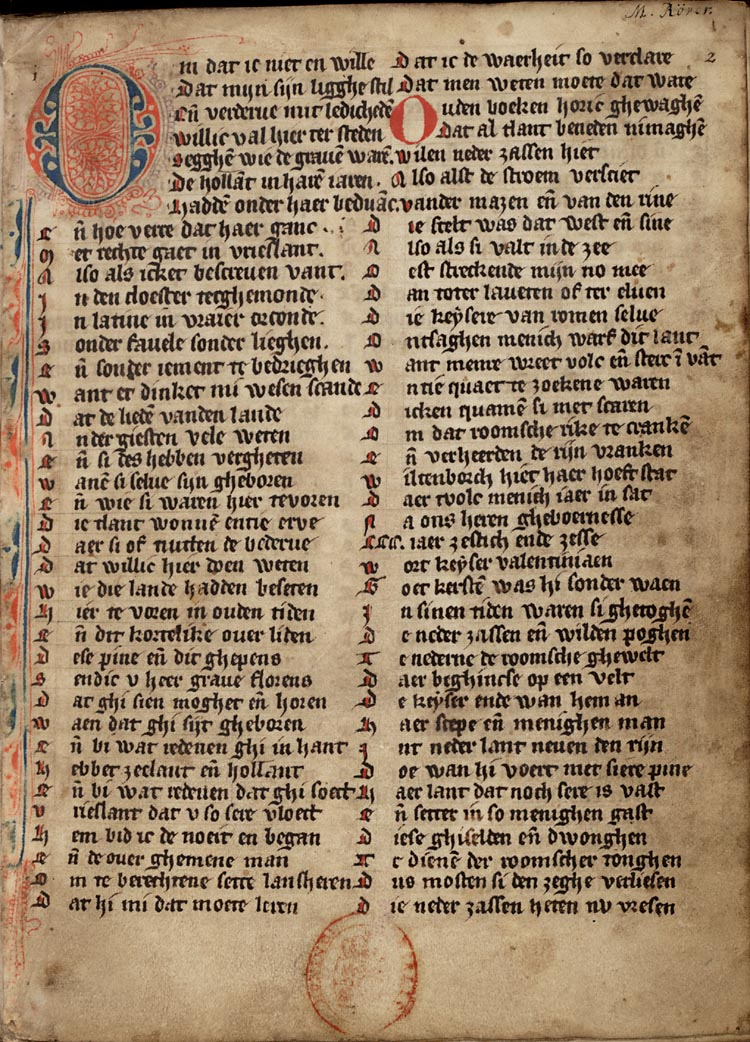
First page of the Rijmkroniek

Melis Stoke (c. 1235 – c. 1305) was a Dutch writer who lived in the 13th century.

== Biography ==
Melis Stoke was probably born in the Dutch province of Zeeland around 1235. He died somewhere around 1305. He started writing in 1290 in Middle Dutch a chronicle in rhyme on the countship of Holland. His most famous work was the Rijmkroniek, the chronicle in rhyme, among the first books written in the Dutch language. In it is the account of the murder of count Floris V. Stoke found his information from written sources, eyewitness accounts and his own observations.

Melis Stoke was a clerk in Floris V's service. He probably learned to read and write in a monastery. Sources do not mention whether Stoke was a monk himself. There is evidence he had been in the service of the city of Dordrecht.
