= Shōgen =

Period of Japanese history (1259–1260 CE)

Shōgen (正元) was a Japanese era name (年号, nengō, lit. "year name") after Shōka and before Bun'ō. This period spanned the years from March 1259 through April 1260. The reigning emperors were Go-Fukakusa-tennō (後深草天皇) and Kameyama-tennō (亀山天皇).

== Change of era ==
- 1259 Shōgen gannen (正元元年): The new era name was created to mark an event or a number of events. The years of the Shōgen era were part of a period marked by famine and epidemics; and the era name was changed in quick succession in the hope that this might bring the period to a close. The previous era ended and a new one commenced in Shōka 3.

== Events ==
- 1259 (Shōgen 1, 11th month): In the 14th year of Go-Fukakusa-tennō's reign (後深草天皇14年), the emperor abdicated; and the succession (senso) was received by his younger brother. Shortly thereafter, Emperor Kameyama is said to have acceded to the throne (sokui).

== Notes ==
Preceded by Shōka	Era or nengō Shōgen; 1259–1260	Succeeded by Bun'ō
