= 1272 =

1272 in various calendars
- Gregorian calendar: 1272; MCCLXXII
- Ab urbe condita: 2025
- Armenian calendar: 721; ԹՎ ՉԻԱ
- Assyrian calendar: 6022
- Balinese saka calendar: 1193–1194
- Bengali calendar: 678–679
- Berber calendar: 2222
- English Regnal year: 56 Hen. 3 – 1 Edw. 1
- Buddhist calendar: 1816
- Burmese calendar: 634
- Byzantine calendar: 6780–6781
- Chinese calendar: 辛未年 (Metal Goat); 3969 or 3762 — to — 壬申年 (Water Monkey); 3970 or 3763
- Coptic calendar: 988–989
- Discordian calendar: 2438
- Ethiopian calendar: 1264–1265
- Hebrew calendar: 5032–5033
- Hindu calendars
- Vikram Samvat: 1328–1329
- Shaka Samvat: 1193–1194
- Kali Yuga: 4372–4373
- Holocene calendar: 11272
- Igbo calendar: 272–273
- Iranian calendar: 650–651
- Islamic calendar: 670–671
- Japanese calendar: Bun'ei 9 (文永９年)
- Javanese calendar: 1182–1183
- Julian calendar: 1272; MCCLXXII
- Korean calendar: 3605
- Minguo calendar: 640 before ROC 民前640年
- Nanakshahi calendar: −196
- Thai solar calendar: 1814–1815
- Tibetan calendar: ལྕགས་མོ་ལུག་ལོ་ (female Iron-Sheep); 1398 or 1017 or 245 — to — ཆུ་ཕོ་སྤྲེ་ལོ་ (male Water-Monkey); 1399 or 1018 or 246

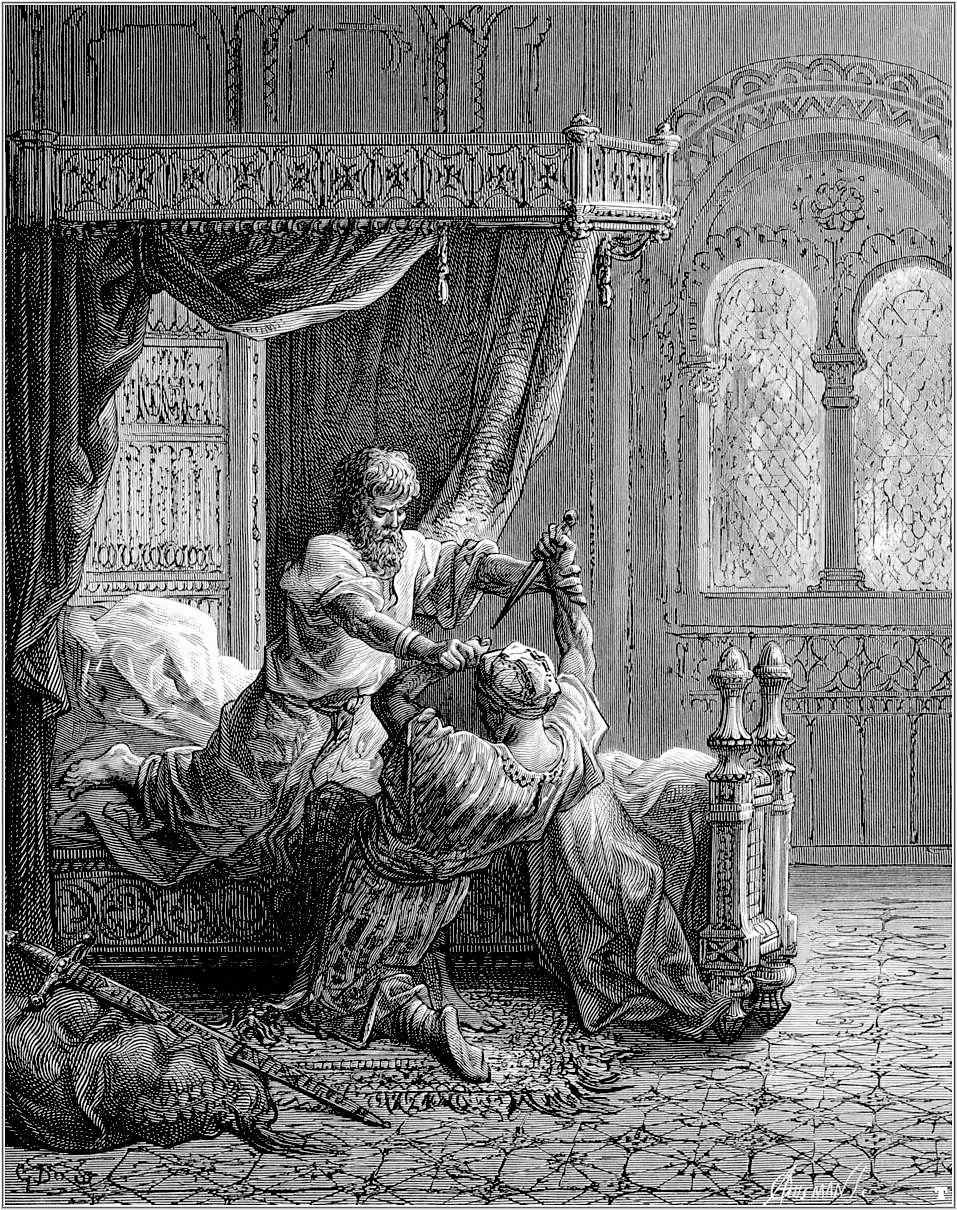
Assassination attempt against The Lord Edward (who will inherit the English throne later in the year) at Acre – 19th century interpretation by Doré

Year 1272 (MCCLXXII) was a leap year starting on Friday of the Julian calendar.

== Events ==
=== By place ===
==== Europe ====
- February – Charles I of Anjou, king of Sicily, occupies the city of Durrës, and establishes the Angevin Kingdom of Albania. A delegation of Albanian nobles and citizens from Durrës make their way to Charles' court.
- February 21 – Charles signs a treaty and is proclaimed King of Albania. He promises to protect the nobles and to honor the privileges they have from the Byzantine Empire. The treaty declares the union between the Kingdom of Albania (Latin: Regnum Albanie) and the Kingdom of Sicily, under Charles' rule. He appoints Gazo Chinard as his vicar-general, and sends his Sicilian fleet to Achaea, to defend the principality against Byzantine attacks.
- June – Marinid forces land in Spain and ravage the countryside. They kill and capture many and plunder livestock. They also attack the castle of Vejer de la Frontera in Andalusia. On hearing the news, King Alfonso X of Castile ("the Wise") abandons his meeting with Sultan Muhammad I of Granada and orders an all-out war against Granada.
- August 6 – King Stephen V of Hungary falls ill and is taken to Csepel Island. He dies and is succeeded by his 10-year-old son Ladislaus IV ("the Cuman"), who is being held captive in the fortress of Koprivnica in northern Croatia. His mother, Queen Elizabeth, becomes regent during the minority of her son (until 1277).
- August 20 – Battle of Heiloo: Floris V, count of Holland, makes an unsuccessful attack on Frisia in an attempt to recover the body of his father, William II, who was killed (16 years ago) by the Frisians near Hoogwoud (modern Netherlands).
- November – Charles I orders his officials to take all Genoese prisoner within his territories, except for the Guelphs and to seize their property. The Sicilian fleet occupies Ajaccio on Corsica. Pope Gregory X condemns the aggressive policy of Charles and proposes that the Genoese elect Guelph officials.
- Reconquista – King Afonso III eliminates the last Moorish community in Portugal at Faro, completing the reconquest of the west of the Iberian Peninsula.

==== England ====
- The Worshipful Company of Cordwainers and Curriers are granted rights to regulate the leather trade in the City of London. The Fishmongers Company receive its first Royal Charter.
- November 16 – King Henry III of England dies at the Palace of Westminster after a 56-year reign. He is succeeded by his son Edward I, who slowly returns from the Holy Land via Gascony.

==== Levant ====
- May 22 – King Hugh III of Cyprus ("the Great") signs a peace with Sultan Baibars, Mamluk ruler of Egypt, at Caesarea. The Kingdom of Jerusalem is guaranteed for 10 years the possession of its present lands, which consists mainly of the narrow coastal plain from Acre to Sidon, together with the right to use without hindrance the pilgrim-road to Nazareth. The County of Tripoli is safeguarded by the peace treaty.
- June 16 – The Lord Edward, heir to the English throne, prevents an assassination attempt on himself at Acre. A Syrian Nizari (or Assassin) supposedly sent by Baibars penetrates into the prince's chamber and stabs him with a poisoned dagger. The wound is not fatal, but Edward is seriously ill for some months. Baibars hastens to dissociate himself from the deed by sending his congratulations on the prince's escape.
- August 18 – Nubian forces sack the Egyptian Red Sea outpost of Aydhab and raid the southern frontier city of Aswan. In return, Baibars invades the kingdom of Makuria.

=== By topic ===
==== Science ====
- In astronomy, the recording of the Alfonsine tables is completed.

== Births ==
- January 14 – Hōjō Sadatoki, Japanese regent (d. 1311)
- January 31 – William Ferrers, English nobleman (d. 1235)
- February 12 – Zhao Bing, Chinese emperor (d. 1279)
- April – Joan of Acre, daughter of Edward I of England (d. 1307)
- May 10 – Bernardo Tolomei, Italian theologian (d. 1348)
- December 13 – Frederick III, king of Sicily (d. 1337)
- Badr al-Din Solamish, Mamluk ruler of Egypt (d. 1291)
- Berthold VII, Count of Henneberg-Schleusingen, German nobleman and regent (d. 1340)
- Eric Longlegs, Lord of Langeland (Erik Eriksøn), Danish nobleman (d. 1310)
- Fath al-Din ibn Sayyid, Egyptian theologian (d. 1334)
- Louis I of Nevers, French nobleman and knight (d. 1322)
- Margaret, Countess of Anjou, French noblewoman (d. 1299)
- Shiwu ('Stonehouse'), Chinese poet (d. 1352)
- Approximate date
  - Amalric, Lord of Tyre, Outremer nobleman and prince (d. 1310)
  - Guy de Beauchamp, 10th Earl of Warwick, English nobleman (d. 1315)
  - Isabel Bruce, queen consort of Norway (d. 1358)
  - Otto I, Landgrave of Hesse, German nobleman (d. 1328)

== Deaths ==
- January 6 – Alfonso of Molina, Leonese prince (b. 1202)
- March 14 – Enzo of Sardinia, king of Sardinia (b. 1218)
- March 17 – Go-Saga, emperor of Japan (b. 1220)
- March 18 – John FitzAlan, English nobleman (b. 1246)
- April 2 – Richard of Cornwall, English nobleman and titular king of Germany (b. 1209)
- April 27 – Zita (or Sitha), Italian maid and saint (b. 1212)
- May 15 – Thomas of Cantimpré, Flemish priest (b. 1201)
- May 20 – Guy de Bourgogne, French abbot and cardinal
- May 27 – Eric I, Duke of Schleswig (Abelsøn), Danish nobleman and knight
- June 10 – Berchtold von Falkenstein, German abbot
- c. June – James Audley (or Aldithel), English high sheriff (b. 1220)
- August 6 – Stephen V, king of Hungary (b. 1239)
- August 7 – Richard Middleton, English Lord Chancellor
- September 18 – Peter III de Brus, English nobleman
- September – Gerard of Abbeville, French monk and theologian (b. 1220)
- October 10 – Yolande of Brittany, French noblewoman
- October 27 – Hugh IV of Burgundy, French nobleman (b. 1213)
- November 16 – Henry III, king of England (b. 1207)
- November 19 – David of Augsburg, German friar and mystic
- December 14 – Berthold of Ratisbon, German monk and preacher (b. 1210)
- December 18 – Philip Türje, Hungarian archbishop (b. 1218)
- Amanieu VII, French nobleman and knight (House of Albret)
- Bartholomeus Anglicus, English monk and encyclopedist
- Guido Guerra V, Italian nobleman and politician (b. 1220)
- Maud de Prendergast, Norman-Irish noblewoman (b. 1242)
- Nikephoros Blemmydes, Byzantine theologian (b. 1197)
- William of Saint-Amour, French philosopher and writer
- Approximate date – William of Sherwood, English philosopher and logician
