= Bun'ei =

Period of Japanese history (1264–1275 CE)

Bun'ei 文永
- February 1264 – April 1275
Kōchō	Kenji
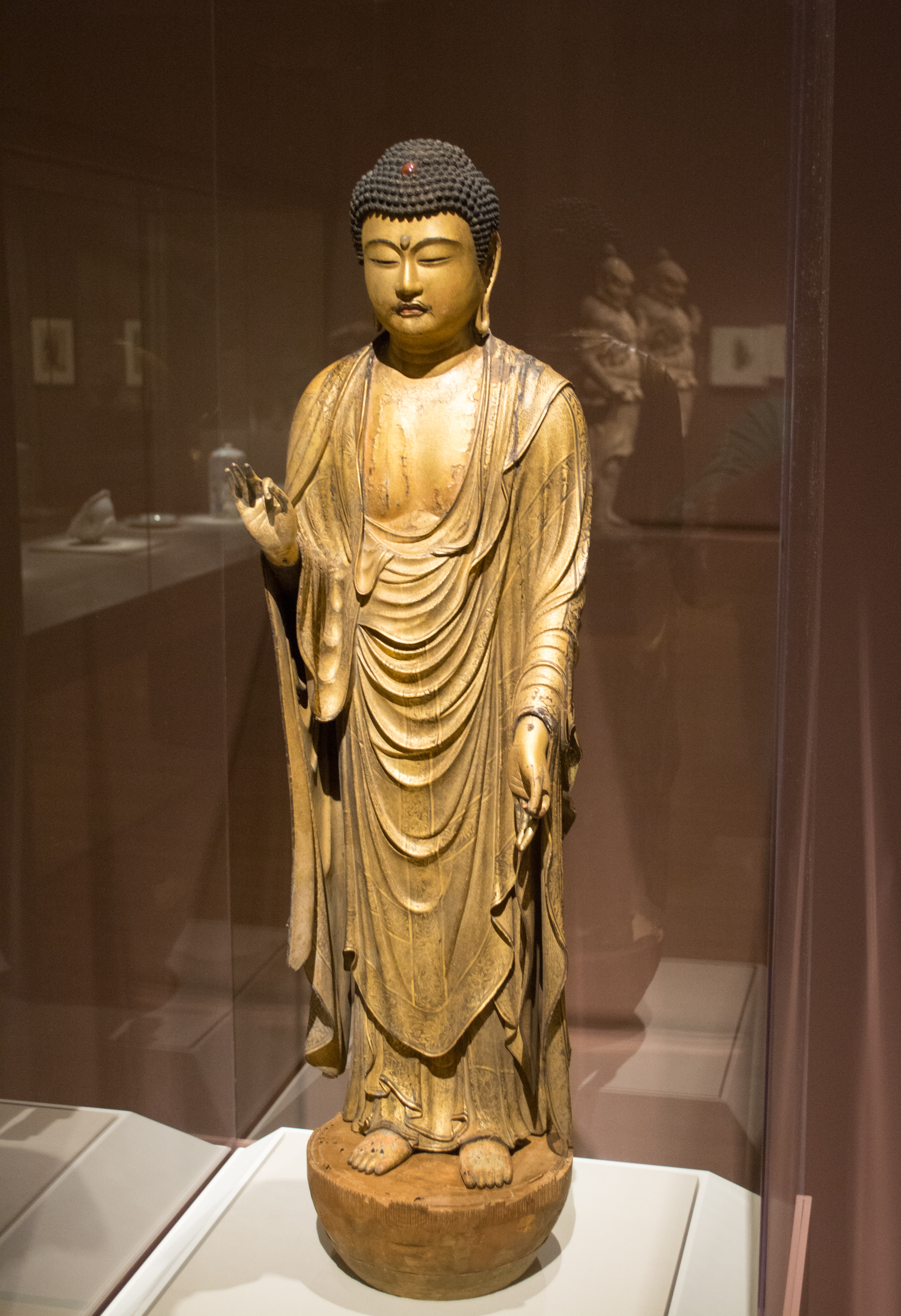
- Buddha of Infinite Light and Life, sculpted in Osaka in 1269 by Kōshun, Kōshin, and Jōshun.
- Location: Japan
- Monarch(s): Emperor Kameyama (to March 1274); Emperor Go-Uda (from March 1274)

Bun'ei (文永) was a Japanese era name (年号, nengō; lit. "year name") after Kōchō and before Kenji. This period spanned the years from February 1264 to April 1275. The reigning emperor was Kameyama-tennō (亀山天皇).

== Change of era ==
- 1264 Bun'ei gannen (文永元年); 1264: The new era name was created to mark an event or a number of events. The previous era ended and a new one commenced in Kōchō 4. The era name comes from the Book of Later Han and combines the characters 文 ("writing") and 永 ("perpetual").

== Events of the Bun'ei era ==
- March 6, 1274 (Bun'ei 11, 26th day of the 1st month): In the 15th year of Kameyama-tennō's reign (亀山天皇15年), the emperor abdicated; and the succession (senso) was received by his cousin.
- May 4, 1274 (Bun'ei 11, 26th day of the 3rd month): Emperor Go-Uda is said to have acceded to the throne (sokui). The retired Emperor Kameyama continued to exercise power as cloistered emperor.

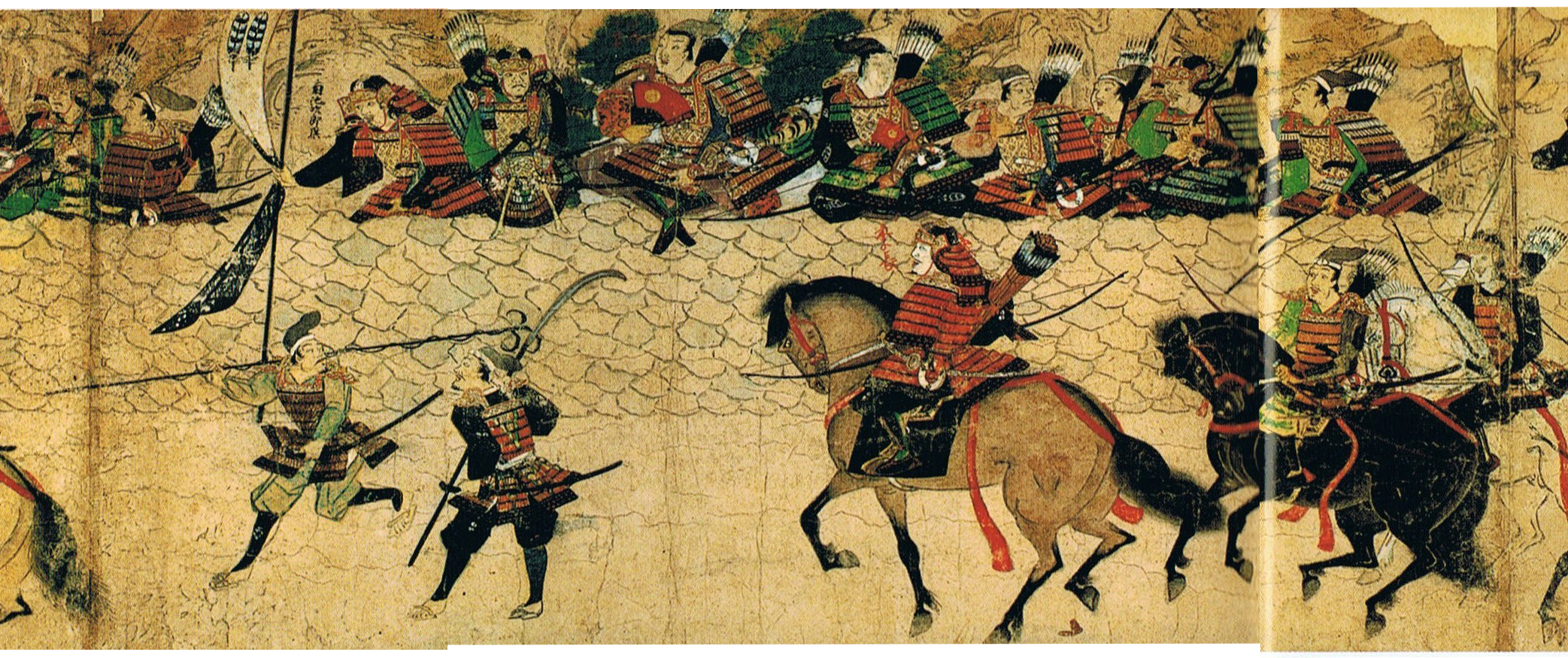
Japanese samurai defending the stone barrier -- from the narrative picture scroll Mōko Shūrai Ekotoba, which was painted between 1275 and 1293.

- November 19, 1274 (Bun'ei 11, 20th day of the 10th month): Battle of Bun'ei -- Kublai Khan's Mongol forces land at Hakata Bay near Fukuoka in Kyūshū. After landing and some armed skirmishes, the invaders withdraw to spend the night on shipboard. That night, a storm sinks several ships, and the fleet retreats to Korea rather than pressing their initial advantage. In the course of the day's fighting, the Hakozaki Shrine was burned to the ground. Nihon Ōdai Ichiran explains that the invaders were defeated because they lacked arrows.

== See also ==
- Mongol invasions of Japan
- Battle of Kōan - the second invasion attempt by Kublai Khan, in 1281.

== Notes ==
Preceded by Kōchō	Era or nengō Bun'ei; 1264–1275	Succeeded by Kenji
