= 1255 =

1255 in various calendars
Gregorian calendar	1255; MCCLV
Ab urbe condita	2008
Armenian calendar	704; ԹՎ ՉԴ
Assyrian calendar	6005
Balinese saka calendar	1176–1177
Bengali calendar	661–662
Berber calendar	2205
English Regnal year	39 Hen. 3 – 40 Hen. 3
Buddhist calendar	1799
Burmese calendar	617
Byzantine calendar	6763–6764
Chinese calendar	甲寅年 (Wood Tiger); 3952 or 3745 — to — 乙卯年 (Wood Rabbit); 3953 or 3746
Coptic calendar	971–972
Discordian calendar	2421
Ethiopian calendar	1247–1248
Hebrew calendar	5015–5016
- Hindu calendars
Vikram Samvat	1311–1312
Shaka Samvat	1176–1177
Kali Yuga	4355–4356
Holocene calendar	11255
Igbo calendar	255–256
Iranian calendar	633–634
Islamic calendar	652–653
Japanese calendar	Kenchō 7 (建長７年)
Javanese calendar	1164–1165
Julian calendar	1255; MCCLV
Korean calendar	3588
Minguo calendar	657 before ROC 民前657年
Nanakshahi calendar	−213
Thai solar calendar	1797–1798
Tibetan calendar	ཤིང་ཕོ་སྟག་ལོ་ (male Wood-Tiger); 1381 or 1000 or 228 — to — ཤིང་མོ་ཡོས་ལོ་ (female Wood-Hare); 1382 or 1001 or 229

Coat of Arms of Walram II of Nassau

Year 1255 (MCCLV) was a common year starting on Friday of the Julian calendar.

== Events ==
=== By place ===
==== Europe ====
- February 25 – Battle of Montebruno: Guelph forces under Thomas II of Savoy invade the Ghibelline territory of Asti (located in the Piedmont region), but he is defeated by the Astigiani army, led by William VII, at Garzigliana (Northern Italy). Thomas retreats and takes refuge in Turin; however, he is later captured by the Ghibellines.
- May – William of Rubruck from Constantinople returns to Cyprus from his missionary journey to convert the Mongols of central and eastern Asia; his efforts have been unsuccessful.
- Emperor Theodore II Laskaris, who is in exile in the Empire of Nicaea, conducts a military campaign to recover Thrace from the Bulgarians.
- King Afonso III of Portugal ("the Boulonnais") moves his residence and royal court from Lisbon to Coimbra, which becomes the capital of Portugal.
- The Teutonic Knights in Prussia found Königsberg (modern-day Kaliningrad) and name it in honour of King Ottokar II of Bohemia.
- The lands of the House of Nassau are divided between the brothers Walram II and Otto I, not to be reunited until 1806.

==== The British Isles ====
- June – Battle of Bryn Derwin: Llywelyn ap Gruffudd defeats his two brothers Dafydd ap Gruffydd and Owain Goch ap Gruffydd, to become sole ruler of northern Wales. Dafydd and Owain are both imprisoned.
- August – Following the death of Little Saint Hugh, in an instance of blood libel, eighteen Jews of Lincoln, are tortured and executed by royal command on suspicion of being involved in the boy's murder.
- A survey of royal privileges is conducted, which is included in the Hundred Rolls, a census seen as a follow-up to the Domesday Book (completed in 1086). The Hundred Rolls is later completed with two larger surveys, in 1274/75 and 1279/80.

=== By topic ===
==== Art and Culture ====
- The Gothic cathedral at Bourges in central France, is completed (it will become a UNESCO World Heritage Site).

==== City and Towns ====
- The town of Banská Bystrica (located in central Slovakia) is granted municipal privileges by King Béla IV of Hungary.

==== Market ====
- Orlando Bonsignori, an Italian minor merchant, forms a consortium called the Gran Tavola ("Great Table"), which becomes the most powerful bank in western Europe. He becomes the exclusive banker for the deposits of the income of the Papal States.

== Births ==
- October 23 – Fernando de la Cerda, Spanish prince (d. 1275)
- Adolf of Nassau-Weilburg, king of Germany (d. 1298)
- Albert I of Germany, Holy Roman Emperor (d. 1308)
- Andrey of Gorodets, Kievan Grand Prince (d. 1304)
- Bogislaw IV, Polish nobleman and knight (d. 1309)
- Dino Compagni, Italian historian and writer (d. 1324)
- Francesca da Rimini, Italian noblewoman (d. 1285)
- John of Paris, French theologian and writer (d. 1306)
- Margherita Colonna, Italian nun and abbess (d. 1280)
- Nicholas I, Bohemian nobleman and knight (d. 1318)
- William Ros, Scottish nobleman and knight (d. 1316)
- Sanjar al-Jawli, Mamluk governor and ruler (d. 1345)
- Sybille of Bâgé, countess consort of Savoy (d. 1294)
- Takaoka Muneyasu, Japanese nobleman (d. 1326)

== Deaths ==
- May 1 – Walter de Gray, English archbishop and statesman
- August 27 – Little Saint Hugh, English Jewish boy (b. 1246)
- Al-Faqih al-Muqaddam, Yemeni religious leader (b. 1178)
- Alice de Montfort, French noblewoman and ruler (suo jure)
- Batu Khan, Mongol ruler and founder of the Golden Horde
- Carintana dalle Carceri, ruler of the Principality of Achaea
- Denis Türje, Hungarian nobleman and military commander
- Eva de Braose, heiresses and wife of William de Cantilupe
- Helena Pedersdatter Strange, queen of Sweden (b. 1200)
- Majd al-Din ibn Taymiyyah, Seljuk judge and theologian
- Masanari, Japanese nobleman and waka poet (b. 1200)
- Muhammad III, ruler of the Nizari Ismaili State (b. 1211)
- Shams al-Din 'Ali ibn Mas'ud, Mihrabanid ruler of Sistan
