= 1265 =

1265 in various calendars
- Gregorian calendar: 1265; MCCLXV
- Ab urbe condita: 2018
- Armenian calendar: 714; ԹՎ ՉԺԴ
- Assyrian calendar: 6015
- Balinese saka calendar: 1186–1187
- Bengali calendar: 671–672
- Berber calendar: 2215
- English Regnal year: 49 Hen. 3 – 50 Hen. 3
- Buddhist calendar: 1809
- Burmese calendar: 627
- Byzantine calendar: 6773–6774
- Chinese calendar: 甲子年 (Wood Rat); 3962 or 3755 — to — 乙丑年 (Wood Ox); 3963 or 3756
- Coptic calendar: 981–982
- Discordian calendar: 2431
- Ethiopian calendar: 1257–1258
- Hebrew calendar: 5025–5026
- Hindu calendars
- Vikram Samvat: 1321–1322
- Shaka Samvat: 1186–1187
- Kali Yuga: 4365–4366
- Holocene calendar: 11265
- Igbo calendar: 265–266
- Iranian calendar: 643–644
- Islamic calendar: 663–664
- Japanese calendar: Bun'ei 2 (文永２年)
- Javanese calendar: 1175–1176
- Julian calendar: 1265; MCCLXV
- Korean calendar: 3598
- Minguo calendar: 647 before ROC 民前647年
- Nanakshahi calendar: −203
- Thai solar calendar: 1807–1808
- Tibetan calendar: ཤིང་ཕོ་བྱི་བ་ལོ་ (male Wood-Rat); 1391 or 1010 or 238 — to — ཤིང་མོ་གླང་ལོ་ (female Wood-Ox); 1392 or 1011 or 239

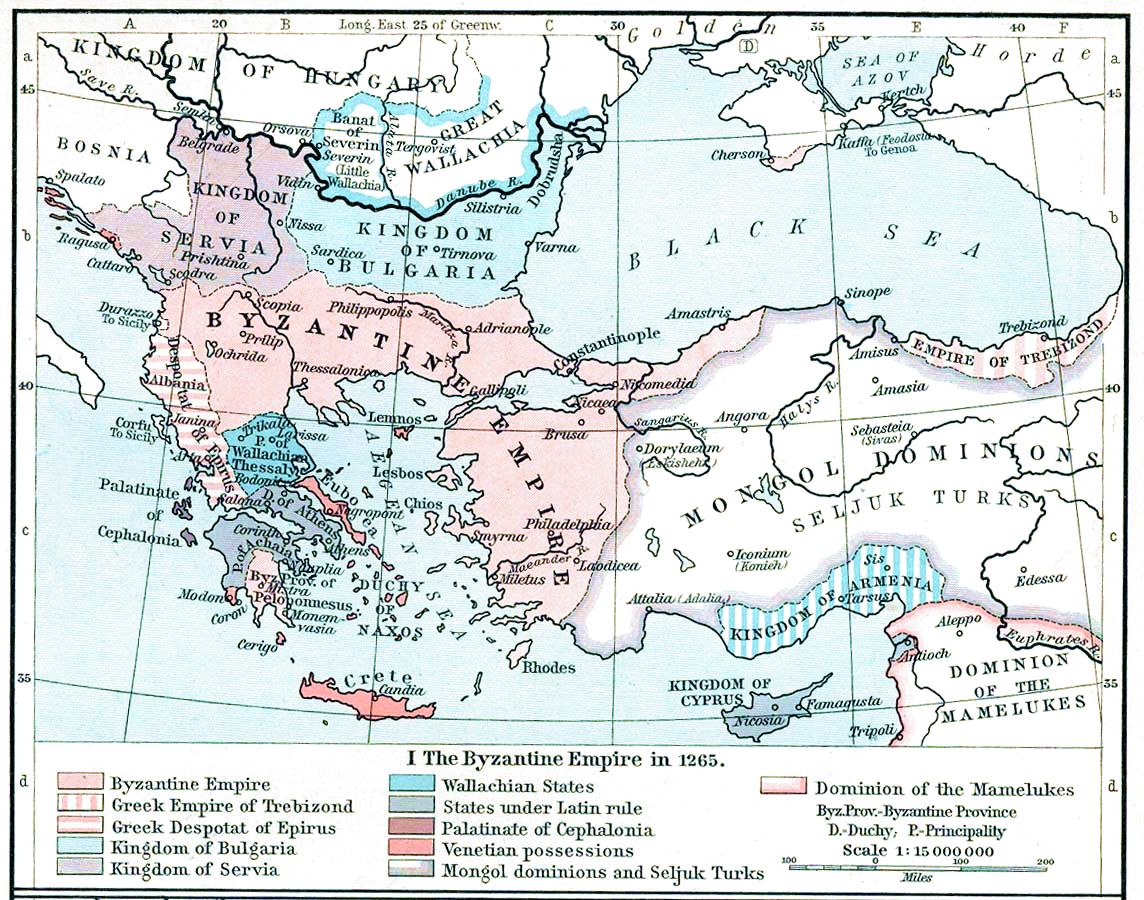
The restored Byzantine Empire and surrounding lands in 1265.

Year 1265 (MCCLXV) was a common year starting on Thursday of the Julian calendar.

== Events ==
=== By place ===
==== Europe ====
- January 20 – In Westminster, the first elected English parliament (called Montfort's Parliament) conducts its first meeting in the Palace of Westminster, later to be known as the Houses of Parliament.
- March – End of the Hungarian Civil War (1264–1265) – Battle of Isaszeg: Younger King Stephen decisively defeats his father's army.
- May 28 – Future King Edward I of England escapes the captivity of Simon de Montfort, 6th Earl of Leicester.
- June 18 – A draft Byzantine–Venetian treaty is concluded between Venetian envoys and Emperor Michael VIII Palaiologos, but is not ratified by Doge Reniero Zeno
- August 4 – Second Barons' War in England: The Battle of Evesham is fought in Worcestershire, with the army of Edward defeating the forces of rebellious barons led by Simon de Montfort, resulting in the death of Montfort and many of his allies. This is sometimes considered the death of chivalry in England.
- The Isle of Man comes under Scottish rule.

==== North Africa and Asia ====
- The Mamluk Sultanate Bahri dynasty of Egypt captures several cities and towns from Crusader states in the Middle East, including the cities of Haifa, Arsuf, and Caesarea Maritima; these events eventually precipitate the Eighth Crusade in 1267.
- Kublai Khan sends a delegation to Japan, which loots islands along the way.
- Fire destroys parts of Old Cairo.
- India, Delhi: Ghiyas-Ud-Din-Balban comes to the throne and introduces Sijdah.
- Mongol armies, led by Nogai Khan, raid Thrace.
- In the first major battle in five years (since the Song dynasty Chinese pushed the forces of Kublai Khan back across the Yangzi River, after Möngke Khan's failed invasion in 1259), Kublai Khan engages the Chinese in Sichuan province. Kublai gains a preliminary victory, and war booty of 146 captured Song dynasty naval ships.

=== By topic ===
==== Culture ====
- The Book of Aneirin, a Welsh manuscript of poetry, is penned.
- The brewing of Budweiser Budvar beer begins in Bohemia; Budweiser Budvar has been produced continuously there to this day.
- Correspondence from Pope Clement IV contains the first known mention of the ring of the Fisherman, an item of papal regalia then used to seal personal correspondence from the pope, and later for papal bulls.
- February 5 – Pope Clement IV succeeds Pope Urban IV, as the 183rd pope.

== Births ==
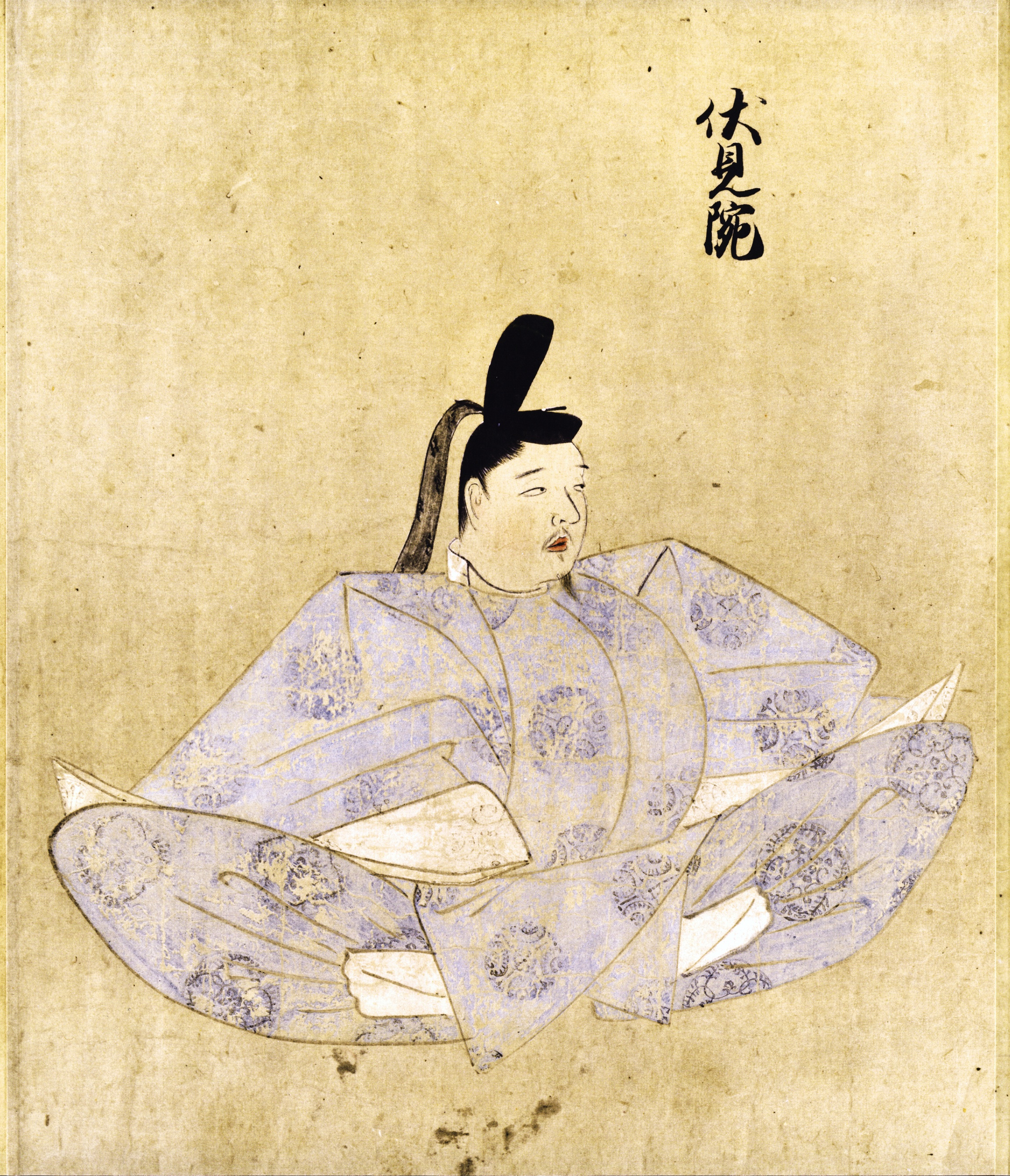
Emperor Fushimi

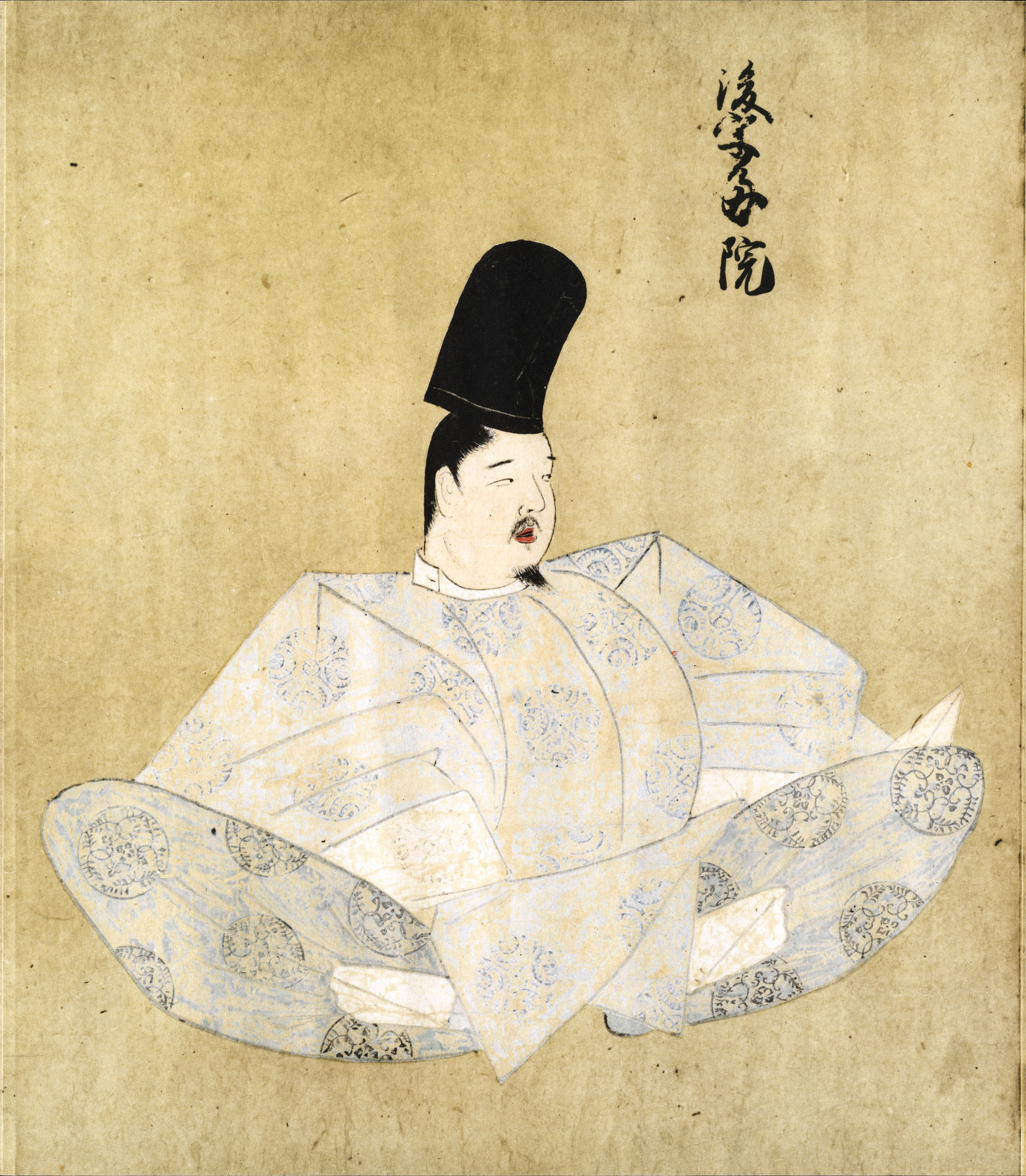
Emperor Go-Uda

- May 10 – Emperor Fushimi of Japan (d. 1317)
- December 17 – Emperor Go-Uda of Japan (d. 1324)
- King Alfonso III of Aragon
- approximate date – Dante Alighieri, Italian poet (d. 1321)
- approximate date – Maria de Molina, regent of Castile (d. 1321)
- approximate date – Beatrice Portinari, Dante Alighieri's beloved and guide through Heaven in The Divine Comedy (d. 1290)

== Deaths ==
- January 20 – John Maunsell, Lord Chancellor of England
- February 8 – Hulagu Khan of the Mongol Empire (b. 1217)
- May 16 – Simon Stock, English prior, canonized (b. c. 1165)
- June 26 – Anne of Bohemia, Duchess of Silesia (b. 1203 or 1204)
- August 4 (Killed in the Battle Of Evesham)
  - Hugh le Despencer, 1st Baron le Despencer (b. 1223)
  - Henry de Montfort (b. 1238)
  - Peter de Montfort
  - Simon de Montfort, 6th Earl of Leicester (b. 1208)
- November 24 – Magnús Óláfsson, King of Mann and the Isles
- December 3 – Odofredus, Italian jurist
- Al-Abharī, Persian philosopher and mathematician (b. 1200)
