= 1284 =

1284 in various calendars
- Gregorian calendar: 1284; MCCLXXXIV
- Ab urbe condita: 2037
- Armenian calendar: 733; ԹՎ ՉԼԳ
- Assyrian calendar: 6034
- Balinese saka calendar: 1205–1206
- Bengali calendar: 690–691
- Berber calendar: 2234
- English Regnal year: 12 Edw. 1 – 13 Edw. 1
- Buddhist calendar: 1828
- Burmese calendar: 646
- Byzantine calendar: 6792–6793
- Chinese calendar: 癸未年 (Water Goat); 3981 or 3774 — to — 甲申年 (Wood Monkey); 3982 or 3775
- Coptic calendar: 1000–1001
- Discordian calendar: 2450
- Ethiopian calendar: 1276–1277
- Hebrew calendar: 5044–5045
- Hindu calendars
- Vikram Samvat: 1340–1341
- Shaka Samvat: 1205–1206
- Kali Yuga: 4384–4385
- Holocene calendar: 11284
- Igbo calendar: 284–285
- Iranian calendar: 662–663
- Islamic calendar: 682–683
- Japanese calendar: Kōan 7 (弘安７年)
- Javanese calendar: 1194–1195
- Julian calendar: 1284; MCCLXXXIV
- Korean calendar: 3617
- Minguo calendar: 628 before ROC 民前628年
- Nanakshahi calendar: −184
- Thai solar calendar: 1826–1827
- Tibetan calendar: ཆུ་མོ་ལུག་ལོ་ (female Water-Sheep); 1410 or 1029 or 257 — to — ཤིང་ཕོ་སྤྲེ་ལོ་ (male Wood-Monkey); 1411 or 1030 or 258

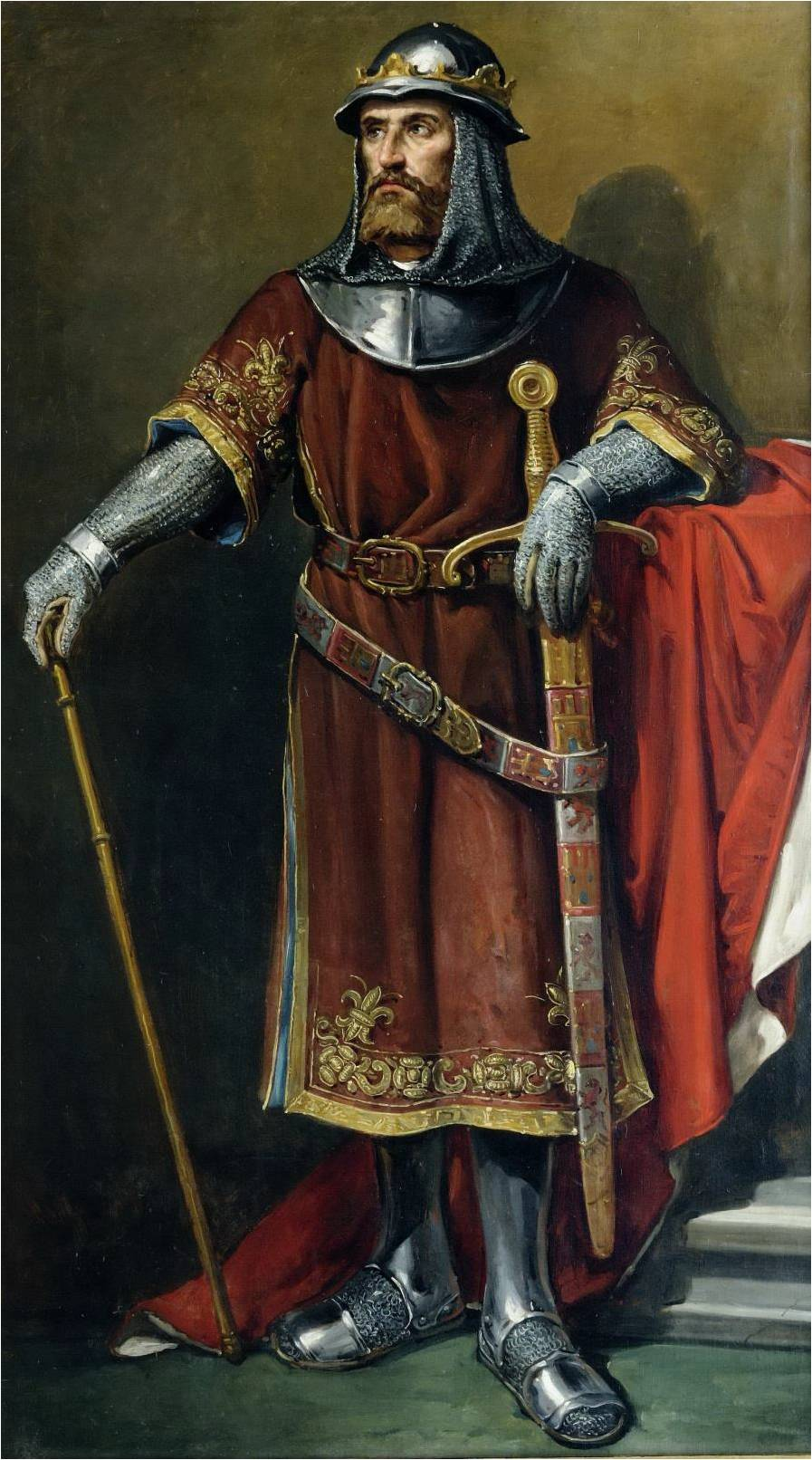
Sancho IV of Castile (1258–1295)

Year 1284 (MCCLXXXIV) was a leap year starting on Saturday of the Julian calendar.

== Events ==
=== By place ===
==== Europe ====
- Aragonese Crusade: The first French armies under King Philip III ("the Bold") and his 14-year-old son Charles of Valois enter Roussillon. They include 16,000 cavalry, 17,000 crossbowmen, and 100,000 infantry, along with 100 ships in south French ports. Though they have the support of James II, ruler of Majorca, the local populace rises against them. Elne is valiantly defended by Aragonese troops, but the French occupy the city, and burn the cathedral, while the population is massacred.
- April 4 – King Alfonso X of Castile ("the Wise") falls ill and dies after a 32-year reign at Seville. He is succeeded by his 25-year-old son Sancho IV ("the Brave") who becomes ruler of Castile and León. Meanwhile, his nephew, Alfonso de la Cerda, challenges his right to the Castilian throne. Pope Martin IV excommunicates Sancho, places an interdict on his kingdom and refuses to acknowledge the marriage to his cousin, Queen María de Molina.
- June 5 – Battle of the Gulf of Naples: An Aragonese-Sicilian fleet (some 30 galleys) led by Admiral Roger of Lauria surrounds and defeats the Neapolitan ships in the Gulf of Naples. King Charles II of Naples ("the Lame") is captured during the battle; disorganized, the remnants of the Neapolitan fleet (between 15 and 18 galleys) flee back to Naples.
- August 5–6 – Battle of Meloria: A Genoese fleet (some 90 galleys) led by Admiral Oberto Doria defeats the Pisan ships in the Ligurian Sea. This marks the decline of the maritime power of Pisa in the Mediterranean.
- King Rudolf I imposes a trade embargo on Norway, due to the latter pillaging a German ship. The embargo cuts off vital supplies of grain, flour, vegetables and beer, causing a general famine in Norway.
- The events giving rise to the story of the Pied Piper of Hamelin take place in Lower Saxony.

==== British Isles ====
- March 3 – Statute of Rhuddlan: King Edward I of England brings Wales under direct rule after the Welsh Wars (1277–1283). He appoints sheriffs and bailiffs for the northern territories while the southern areas are left under the control of the Marcher Lords. English law is introduced in criminal cases, though the Welsh are allowed to maintain their customary laws in some cases of property disputes. He arranges a Round Table (tournament) at Nefyn in Wales and promises the Welsh that he will provide them with a Prince of Wales. On April 25, his son, the future Edward II of England, is born at Caernarfon Castle in Wales.

==== Africa ====
- Hafsid forces under Abu Hafs Umar bin Yahya (half-brother of Abu Ishaq Ibrahim I) reconquer Tunis and reinstall the Hafsid dynasty as the dominating power in Ifriqiya. This ends the Bedouin rebellion started in 1283.
- King Peter III of Aragon takes advantage of the weakness of the Hafsid dynasty and raids the island of Djerba. Aragonese forces massacre the population and occupy the island.

==== Asia ====
- King Kertanagara of Singhasari invades the island of Bali and captures its queen.

=== By topic ===
==== Art and culture ====
- Construction of Beauvais Cathedral is interrupted by a partial collapse of the choir; the event unnerves French masons working in the Gothic style.
- Jean de Meun, French poet and writer, translates Vegetius' 4th century military treatise De Re Militari from Latin into French.

==== Cities and towns ====
- May 18 – Jönköping in Sweden is granted town privileges by King Magnus Ladulås.

==== Education ====
- Peterhouse, oldest collegiate foundation of the University of Cambridge in England, is established by Bishop Hugh de Balsham.

==== Health ====
- The Al-Mansuri bimaristan (hospital) is completed in Cairo.

==== Markets ====
- The Republic of Venice begins coining the ducat, a gold coin that is to become the standard of European coinage, for the following 600 years.

== Births ==
- April 25 – Edward II, king of England (d. 1327)
- April 26 – Alice de Toeni, Countess of Warwick, English noblewoman (d. 1325)
- Delphine of Glandèves, French noblewoman (d. 1358)
- Edward, Count of Savoy ("the Liberal"), Savoyan nobleman (d. 1329)
- John I, Dutch nobleman (House of Holland) (d. 1299)
- Piers Gaveston, 1st Earl of Cornwall, English nobleman and knight, royal favourite (k. 1312)
- Wernher von Homberg, Swiss knight and poet (d. 1320)
- Yu Qin, Chinese official, geographer and writer (d. 1333)
- Approximate date – Thomas de Brus, Scottish nobleman and knight (k. 1307)

== Deaths ==
- January 18 – Qonqurtai, Mongol nobleman and viceroy
- January 28 – Alexander, Scottish prince and heir (b. 1264)
- February 12 – Humphrey of Montfort, Outremer nobleman
- March 24 – Hugh III ("the Great"), king of Cyprus (b. 1235)
- March 28 – John de Derlington, English archbishop and theologian
- c. March – Kaykhusraw III, Seljuk ruler of the Sultanate of Rum, executed
- April 4 – Alfonso X ("the Wise"), king of Castile (b. 1221)
- April 6 – Peter I, Count of Alençon, French nobleman and prince (b. 1251)
- April 9 – Adelaide of Holland, Dutch noblewoman (b. 1230)
- April 15 – Jordan of Osnabrück, German political writer
- April 20 – Hōjō Tokimune, Japanese nobleman (b. 1251)
- May – Isa ibn Muhanna, Mamluk ruler, commander and prince
- July 30 – Sturla Þórðarson, Icelandic chieftain (b. 1214)
- August 9 – James of Castile, Lord of Cameros, son of Alfonso X (b. 1268)
- August 10 – Tekuder, Mongol ruler of the Ilkhanate (b. 1246)
- August 19 – Alphonso, Earl of Chester, English nobleman and heir (b. 1273)
- August 30 – Ichijō Sanetsune, Japanese nobleman (b. 1223)
- October 16 – Shams al-Din Juvayni, Persian ruler and vizier
- November 9 – Siger of Brabant, Dutch philosopher (b. 1240)
- December – Irene Komnene Palaiologina, Byzantine princess (b. 1218)
- Al-Mansur II Muhammad, Ayyubid ruler of Hama (b. 1214)
- Ibn Kammuna, Arab Jewish philosopher and writer (b. 1215)
