= 1267 =

1267 in various calendars
- Gregorian calendar: 1267; MCCLXVII
- Ab urbe condita: 2020
- Armenian calendar: 716; ԹՎ ՉԺԶ
- Assyrian calendar: 6017
- Balinese saka calendar: 1188–1189
- Bengali calendar: 673–674
- Berber calendar: 2217
- English Regnal year: 51 Hen. 3 – 52 Hen. 3
- Buddhist calendar: 1811
- Burmese calendar: 629
- Byzantine calendar: 6775–6776
- Chinese calendar: 丙寅年 (Fire Tiger); 3964 or 3757 — to — 丁卯年 (Fire Rabbit); 3965 or 3758
- Coptic calendar: 983–984
- Discordian calendar: 2433
- Ethiopian calendar: 1259–1260
- Hebrew calendar: 5027–5028
- Hindu calendars
- Vikram Samvat: 1323–1324
- Shaka Samvat: 1188–1189
- Kali Yuga: 4367–4368
- Holocene calendar: 11267
- Igbo calendar: 267–268
- Iranian calendar: 645–646
- Islamic calendar: 665–666
- Japanese calendar: Bun'ei 4 (文永４年)
- Javanese calendar: 1177–1178
- Julian calendar: 1267; MCCLXVII
- Korean calendar: 3600
- Minguo calendar: 645 before ROC 民前645年
- Nanakshahi calendar: −201
- Thai solar calendar: 1809–1810
- Tibetan calendar: མེ་ཕོ་སྟག་ལོ་ (male Fire-Tiger); 1393 or 1012 or 240 — to — མེ་མོ་ཡོས་ལོ་ (female Fire-Hare); 1394 or 1013 or 241

Year 1267 (MCCLXVII) was a common year starting on Saturday of the Julian calendar.

== Events ==
=== By place ===
==== Asia and North Africa ====
- The "Grand Capital" is constructed in Khanbaliq (modern-day Beijing) by Kublai Khan, having moved the capital of the Mongol Empire there three years prior.
- Malik ul Salih establishes Samudra Pasai, the first Muslim state in Indonesia.
- Spain attempts an invasion of Morocco, but the Muslim empire Marinid Sultanate successfully defend against the invasion, and drive out Spanish forces.

==== Europe ====
- February 16 – Kings Afonso III of Portugal and Alfonso X of Castile sign the Badajoz Convention, determining the border between the Kingdom of Portugal and the Kingdom of León and ensuring Portuguese sovereignty over Algarve.
- May 27 – Treaty of Viterbo: Emperor Baldwin II of Constantinople gifts the Principality of Achaea to King Charles I of Sicily, in the hope that Charles can help him restore the Latin Empire.
- by Summer – The Second Barons' War in England ends as the rebels and King Henry III of England accept the peace terms laid out in the Dictum of Kenilworth (1266).
- September 29 – Treaty of Montgomery: King Henry III of England acknowledges Llywelyn ap Gruffudd's title of Prince of Wales.
- The city of Ostrava in Moravia is first recorded.

=== Culture ===
- Roger Bacon completes his work Opus Majus and sends it to Pope Clement IV, who had requested it be written; the work contains wide-ranging discussion of mathematics, optics, alchemy, astronomy, astrology and other topics, and includes what some believe to be the first description of a magnifying glass. Bacon also completes Opus Minus, a summary of Opus Majus, later in the same year. The only source for his date of birth is his statement in the Opus Tertium, written in 1267, that "forty years have passed since I first learned the alphabet". The 1214 birth date assumes he was not being literal, and meant 40 years had passed since he matriculated at Oxford at the age of 13. If he had been literal, his birth date was more likely to have been around 1220.
- The leadership of Vienna forces Jews to wear the Pileum cornutum, a cone-shaped head dress, in addition to the yellow badges Jews are already forced to wear.
- November 18 – In England, the Statute of Marlborough is passed, the oldest English law still (partially) in force.

== Births ==
- February 3 (or February 3, 1266) – Richard FitzAlan, 8th Earl of Arundel (d. 1302)
- August 10 – King James II of Aragon (d. 1327)
- Giotto, Italian artist who marked the shift from medieval art to Proto-Renaissance art. (d. 1337)
- Roger de Flor, Sicilian military adventurer, leader of the mercenary group Catalan Company

== Deaths ==
- February 21 – Baldwin of Ibelin, Seneschal of Cyprus
- March 3 or 4 – Lars, Archbishop of Uppsala
- March 17 – Peter of Montereau, French architect (b. c. 1200)
- September 23 – Beatrice of Provence, countess regnant of Provence (b. 1234)
- November 19 – Pedro Gallego, Franciscan scholar and translator
- November 26 – Sylvester Gozzolini, Italian founder of the Sylvestrines (b. 1177)
- November/December – Hugh II of Cyprus, king of Cyprus and regent of the Kingdom of Jerusalem. (b. 1253)
- date unknown – John FitzAlan, 6th Earl of Arundel, Breton-English nobleman and Marcher Lord (b. 1223)
