= 1262 =

1262 in various calendars
Gregorian calendar	1262; MCCLXII
Ab urbe condita	2015
Armenian calendar	711; ԹՎ ՉԺԱ
Assyrian calendar	6012
Balinese saka calendar	1183–1184
Bengali calendar	668–669
Berber calendar	2212
English Regnal year	46 Hen. 3 – 47 Hen. 3
Buddhist calendar	1806
Burmese calendar	624
Byzantine calendar	6770–6771
Chinese calendar	辛酉年 (Metal Rooster); 3959 or 3752 — to — 壬戌年 (Water Dog); 3960 or 3753
Coptic calendar	978–979
Discordian calendar	2428
Ethiopian calendar	1254–1255
Hebrew calendar	5022–5023
- Hindu calendars
Vikram Samvat	1318–1319
Shaka Samvat	1183–1184
Kali Yuga	4362–4363
Holocene calendar	11262
Igbo calendar	262–263
Iranian calendar	640–641
Islamic calendar	660–661
Japanese calendar	Kōchō 2 (弘長２年)
Javanese calendar	1171–1173
Julian calendar	1262; MCCLXII
Korean calendar	3595
Minguo calendar	650 before ROC 民前650年
Nanakshahi calendar	−206
Thai solar calendar	1804–1805
Tibetan calendar	阴金鸡年 (female Iron-Rooster); 1388 or 1007 or 235 — to — 阳水狗年 (male Water-Dog); 1389 or 1008 or 236

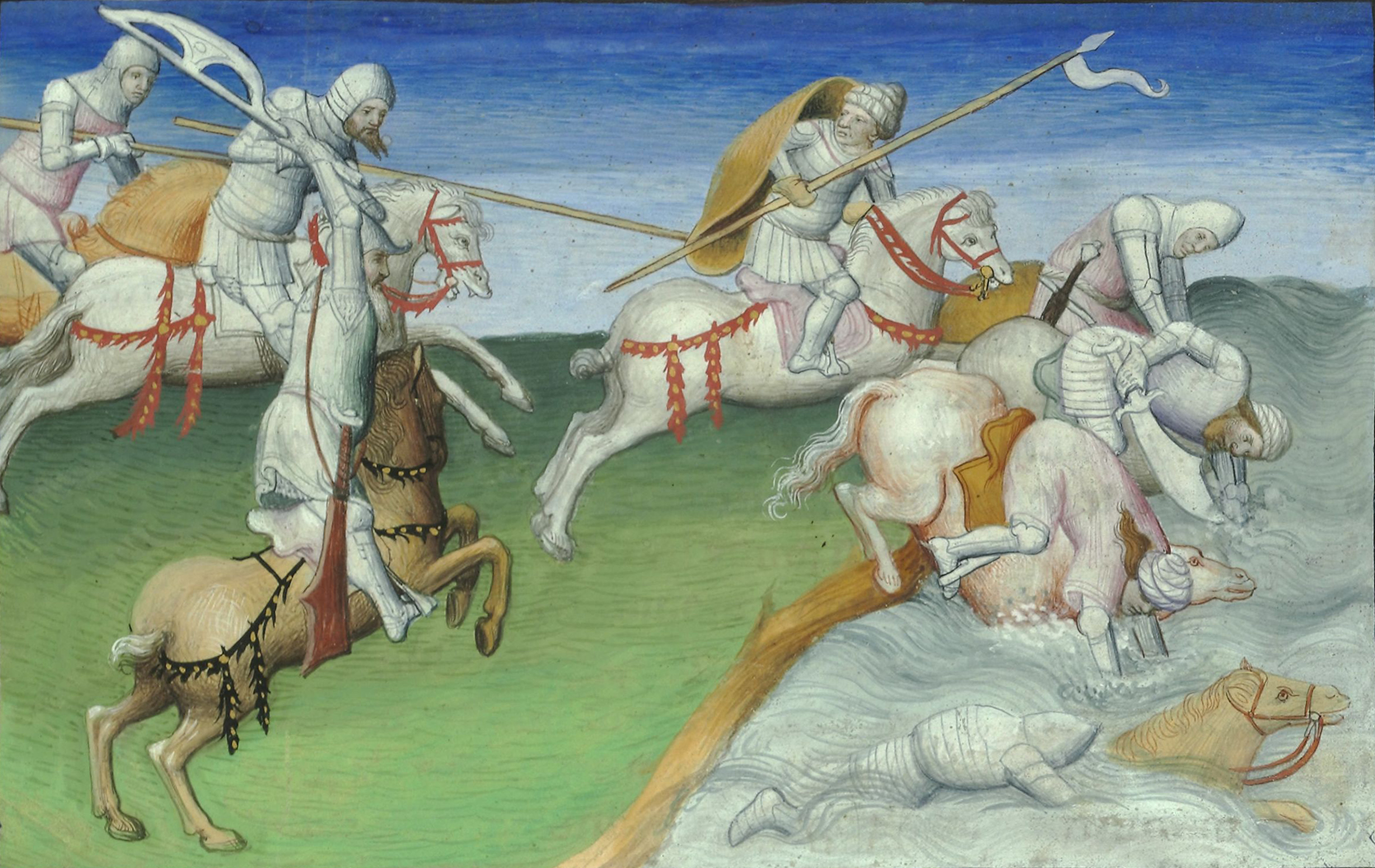
Hulagu Khan is defeated by his cousin Berke Khan at the Terek River (1262).

Year 1262 (MCCLXII) was a common year starting on Sunday of the Julian calendar.

== Events ==
=== By place ===
==== Mongol Empire ====
- Berke–Hulagu war: Mongol forces under Berke Khan, ruler of the Golden Horde, raid territory in the Caucasus belonging to his cousin Hulagu Khan, ruler of the Ilkhanate. Berke supports the Georgian rebels and allies with the Mamluks. He defeats the Ilkhanate forces on the Terek River, together with the Mamluk army led by Baibars (or Abu al-Futuh), saving Palestine and Arabia from Ilkhanate occupation.

==== Europe ====
- March 8 – Battle of Hausbergen: The bourgeois of Strasbourg defeat a German army of knights (some 5,000 men) under Bishop Walter of Geroldseck. Strasbourg becomes an imperial Free City of the Holy Roman Empire.
- May – King Alfonso X ("the Wise") of Castile and León, at a meeting in Jaén, demands military support from Muhammad I, ruler of Granada, and relinquishes the ports of Tarifa and Algeciras to prepare an invasion of North Africa.
- September 14 – Reconquista: Castilian-Leonese forces led by Alfonso X conquer Cádiz. The city has been under Moorish rule since 711. The Muslims are ousted, and Alfonso repopulates the region (also called the Repoblación).
- The Icelandic Commonwealth enters into the Old Covenant (Gissurarsáttmáli), establishing a union with Norway, and acknowledges King Haakon IV of Norway ("the Old") as its ruler.
- King Mindaugas of Lithuania perhaps renounces Christianity, returning to the country's pagan roots, and reverting to Grand Duke.

==== Levant ====
- Al-Hakim I, a member of the Abbasid dynasty, travels to Egypt and is proclaimed as caliph of Cairo in succession to his former rival Al-Mustansir II. After his arrival, he is imprisoned at the Citadel of Cairo by orders of Sultan Baibars but released in 1296 by Sultan Lajin.

==== Asia ====
- King Mangrai of Lan Na (modern Northern Thailand) founds the city of Chiang Rai as the kingdom's capital.

=== By topic ===
==== Arts and Culture ====
- Adam de la Halle, French trouvère and musician, writes the first operetta, Le Jeu de la Feuillee.

==== Markets ====
- The Venice Senate starts consolidating all of the Republic's outstanding debt into a single fund, later known as the Monte Vecchio. The holders of the newly created prestiti are promised a 5% annual coupon. These claims can be sold, and quickly (before 1320) give rise to the first recorded secondary market for financial assets, in Medieval Europe.

==== Religion ====
- January 25 – Richard of Chichester in England (d. 1253) is canonized as a saint; he is best known for authoring the prayer adapted into the song "Day by Day" in the musical Godspell (1971).

==== Science and Technology ====
- Alfonso X of Castile ("the Wise") commissions Yehuda ben Moshe and Isaac ibn Sid to compile the Alfonsine Tables, describing the movement of the planets.

== Births ==
- May 6 – John Hastings, English nobleman and knight (d. 1313)
- August 5 – Ladisslaus IV ("the Cuman"), king of Hungary (d. 1290)
- October 18 – Ranulph Neville (or Ralph), English nobleman (d. 1331)
- Bérenger de Landore, French preacher and archbishop (d. 1330)
- Elisabeth of Carinthia (or Tyrol), queen consort of Germany (d. 1312)
- Guan Daogao, Chinese calligrapher, poet and painter (d. 1319)
- Guan Daosheng, Chinese painter, poet and writer (d. 1319)
- John II (Megas Komnenos), emperor of Trebizond (d. 1297)
- John of Castile, Lord of Valencia de Campos, Spanish prince (infante) and regent (d. 1319)
- Takatsukasa Kanetada, Japanese nobleman (kugyō) (d. 1301)
- U T'ak (or Woo Tak), Korean scholar and philosopher (d. 1342)
- William de Cantilupe, Anglo-Norman nobleman and knight (d. 1308)

== Deaths ==
- April 23 – Giles of Assisi, companion of Francis of Assisi (b. 1190)
- May 18 – John Climping, English cleric, chancellor and bishop
- June 23 – Siemowit I of Masovia, Polish nobleman and knight (House of Piast)
- July 13 – Henry Wingham, English Lord Chancellor and bishop
- July 14 – Richard de Clare, 6th Earl of Gloucester, English nobleman and knight (b. 1222)
- August 24 – Robert de Mariscis, English priest and archdeacon
- September 1 – Giuliana of Collalto, Italian Benedictine abbess and Blessed
- September 12 – Baldwin de Redvers, 7th Earl of Devon, English nobleman (b. 1236)
- October 5 – Teruko, Japanese princess and empress (b. 1224)
- December 13 – Giles of Bridport, English archdeacon and bishop
- December 21 – Bahauddin Zakariya, Ghurid scholar and poet
- Ibn al-Adim, Syrian diplomat, biographer and historian (b. 1192)
- Izz al-Din ibn 'Abd al-Salam, Syrian jurist and theologian (b. 1181)
- Matilda II, Countess of Nevers (or Maud of Dampierre), French noblewoman and regent (b. c. 1235)
- Mem Soares de Melo, 1st Lord de Melo, Portuguese nobleman and knight (b. 1200)
- Peter de Rivaux, Poitevin-born English High Sheriff and Lord High Treasurer
