= 1278 =

1278 in various calendars
- Gregorian calendar: 1278; MCCLXXVIII
- Ab urbe condita: 2031
- Armenian calendar: 727; ԹՎ ՉԻԷ
- Assyrian calendar: 6028
- Balinese saka calendar: 1199–1200
- Bengali calendar: 684–685
- Berber calendar: 2228
- English Regnal year: 6 Edw. 1 – 7 Edw. 1
- Buddhist calendar: 1822
- Burmese calendar: 640
- Byzantine calendar: 6786–6787
- Chinese calendar: 丁丑年 (Fire Ox); 3975 or 3768 — to — 戊寅年 (Earth Tiger); 3976 or 3769
- Coptic calendar: 994–995
- Discordian calendar: 2444
- Ethiopian calendar: 1270–1271
- Hebrew calendar: 5038–5039
- Hindu calendars
- Vikram Samvat: 1334–1335
- Shaka Samvat: 1199–1200
- Kali Yuga: 4378–4379
- Holocene calendar: 11278
- Igbo calendar: 278–279
- Iranian calendar: 656–657
- Islamic calendar: 676–677
- Japanese calendar: Kenji 4 / Kōan 1 (弘安元年)
- Javanese calendar: 1188–1189
- Julian calendar: 1278; MCCLXXVIII
- Korean calendar: 3611
- Minguo calendar: 634 before ROC 民前634年
- Nanakshahi calendar: −190
- Thai solar calendar: 1820–1821
- Tibetan calendar: མེ་མོ་གླང་ལོ་ (female Fire-Ox); 1404 or 1023 or 251 — to — ས་ཕོ་སྟག་ལོ་ (male Earth-Tiger); 1405 or 1024 or 252

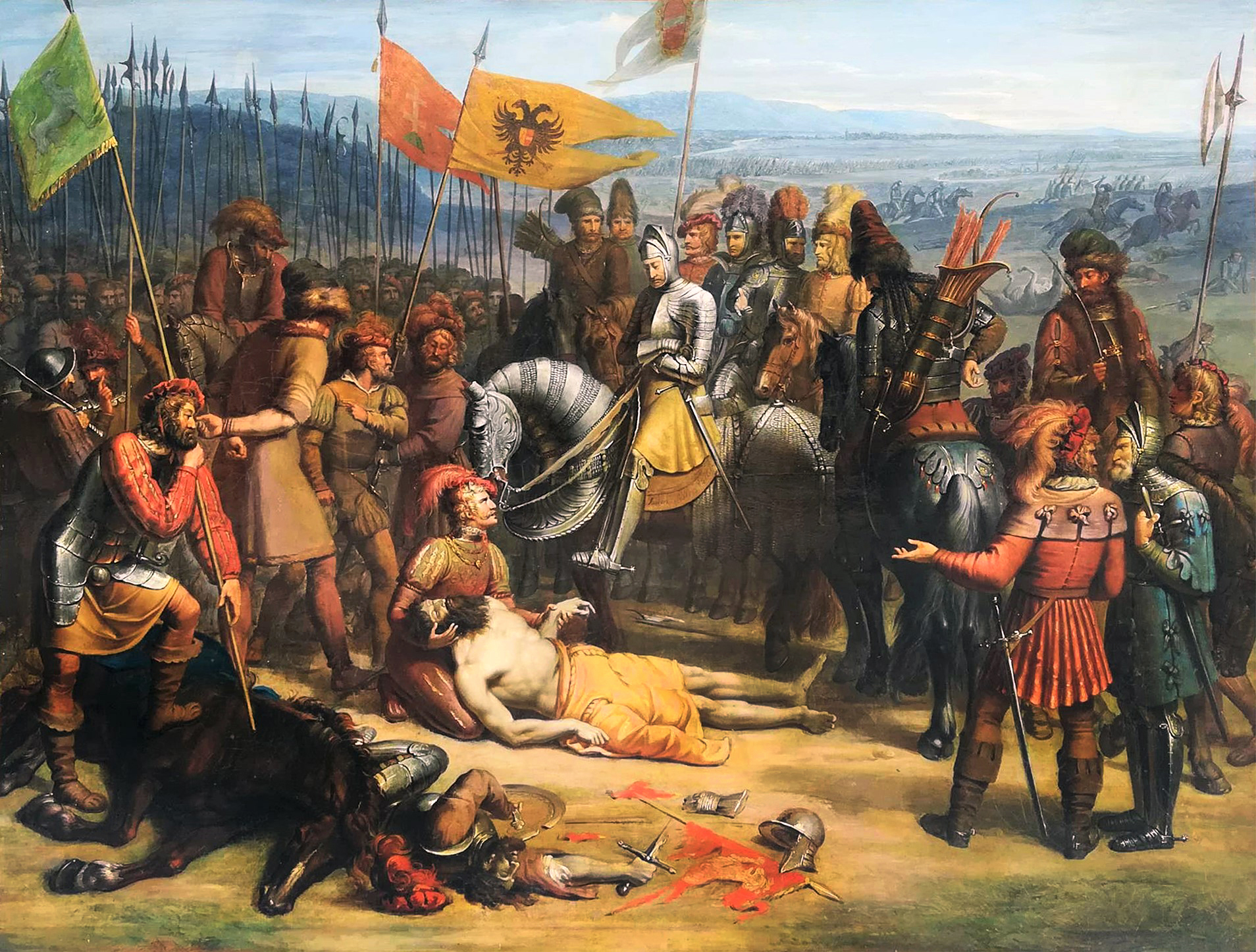
Battle on the Marchfeld by Anton Petter

Year 1278 (MCCLXXVIII) was a common year starting on Saturday of the Julian calendar.

== Events ==
=== By place ===
==== Europe ====
- May 1 – William of Villehardouin, prince of Achaea, dies. By the terms of the Treaty of Viterbo, his lands passed under the direct control of Charles I, king of Sicily. Charles appoints a bailiff to rule the Latin principality. In response, Charles swears fealty to the new pope, Nicholas III, on May 24. He promises not to attack or invade the Byzantine Empire because Nicholas has hopes to unify the Orthodox Church with the Catholic Church.
- August 5 – Reconquista: Siege of Algeciras – Castilian forces (some 30,000 men) led by King Alfonso X ("the Wise") besiege Algeciras (at this time under control of the Marinids). A fleet of 24 ships and some 80 galleys is placed in the Bay of Gibraltar to prevent the supply of the city from nearby Gibraltar. The fleet is made up of most of the members of the Order of Saint Mary of Spain, a military-religious order which is concentrated in naval warfare.
- August 26 – Battle on the Marchfeld: German-Hungarian forces (some 9,000 men) led by Kings Rudolf I of Germany in alliance with Ladislaus IV of Hungary ("the Cuman"), defeat and kill Ottokar II, ruler of Bohemia. The battle ends the power struggle between Rudolf and Ottokar over the fate of Central Europe. Rudolf's House of Habsburg will continue to rule Austria and other captured territories until the end of World War I in 1918.
- September 29 – Reconquista: Aragonese forces led by King Peter III take the Muslim stronghold of Montesa, putting an end to two years of Mudéjar rebellion. The defeated Muslims are expelled from the realm and go into exile.

==== England ====
- November 17 – King Edward I ("Longshanks") raises the penalty for coin clipping from banishment to execution. All Jews are subjected to arrest and search of their homes on suspicion of coin clipping. Some 680 Jews are imprisoned in the Tower of London, with more than 300 subsequently executed. At this time, the Jewish population is believed to have been some 3,000.

==== Africa ====
- April – Egyptian vizier Bahaa el-Din bin Hanna dies in office at the age of 73, making him the longest-serving vizier of the Egyptian Mamluk Sultanate.

==== Levant ====
- January – Charles I is crowned King of Jerusalem, and is recognized by the kingdom's barons at Acre. He surrenders the vicariate of Tuscany to Nicholas III. His bailiff, Roger of San Severino, appoints various Frenchmen from Charles' court as his chief officers. Bohemond VII, count of Tripoli (and nominal Prince of Antioch), acknowledges Roger as lawful bailiff.

==== Asia ====
- May 8 – The 7-year-old Emperor Emperor Duanzong (or Zhao Shi) dies of illness. He is succeeded by his brother Zhao Bing who becomes the last ruler of the Song dynasty. Meanwhile, Mongol forces under the control of Mongol leader Kublai Khan ("Great Khan") draw closer to the remnants of the Song imperial court.
- November 8 – Trần Thánh Tông, second emperor of Vietnam's Trần dynasty, takes up the post of Retired Emperor, but continues for 11 years to co-rule with his son Trần Khâm.

=== By topic ===
==== Art and Culture ====
- The earliest known written copy of the Avesta, a collection of ancient sacred Persian Zoroastrian texts previously passed down orally, is produced.

==== Markets ====
- Giles of Lessines writes his De usuris. He estimates that some credit contracts need not to be usurious, as "future things are not estimated to be of such value as those collected in the instant". The prevalence of this view in the usury debate allows for the development of the financial industry in Roman Catholic Europe.

==== Religion ====
- September 8 – Pere d'Urtx, Catalan bishop of Urgell, becomes the first Episcopal Co-Prince of Andorra, when he signs the paréage, establishing joint-sovereignty over the territory with Roger-Bernard III, count of Foix.

== Births ==
- January 10/11 – Rita of Armenia, Byzantine empress consort (d. 1333)
- March 11 – Mary of Woodstock, English princess, nun (d. 1332)
- May 9 – Kokan Shiren, Japanese Zen patriarch (d. 1347)
- August 26 – Safi al-Din al-Hilli, Persian poet and writer (d. 1349)
- September 8 – Theobald II, English nobleman (d. 1316)
- November 10 – Philip I, Prince of Taranto, Neapolitan prince (d. 1331)
- Christopher Seton, Scottish nobleman and knight (d. 1306)
- Constantine I (or III), co-ruler of Cilician Armenia (d. 1310)
- Ferdinand of Majorca, Aragonese prince (infante) (d. 1316)
- Hōjō Sadaaki, Japanese nobleman and regent (d. 1333)
- Jean van Hocsem, Belgian monk and historian (d. 1348)
- John de Graham, Scottish nobleman and knight (d. 1337)
- Philip I of Piedmont, Latin prince of Achaea (d. 1334)
- Thomas of Lancaster, English nobleman (d. 1322)

== Deaths ==
- January 3 – Ladislaus II Kán, Hungarian nobleman and knight
- January 22 – Roger de Skerning, English monk and bishop
- March 16 – William IV, German nobleman and knight (b. 1210)
- March 28 or 29 – Bertrand de Saint-Martin, French cardinal and archbishop
- May 1 – William II of Villehardouin, prince of Achaea (b. 1211)
- May 8 – Emperor Duanzong (or Zhao Shi), Chinese emperor (b. 1270)
- June 30 – Pierre de la Broce, French nobleman and councilor
- August 16 – Napoleone della Torre (or Napo), Italian nobleman
- August 26 – Ottokar II, Bohemian nobleman and king (b. 1233)
- September or October – Robert de Chauncy, English cleric, bishop and high sheriff
- November 13 – Barnim I, German nobleman (House of Griffin)
- December 26/31 – Bolesław II the Horned, Polish nobleman (House of Piast)
- December (or 1277) – Sambor II of Tczew, German nobleman, prince and knight
- Andrew, Duke of Slavonia, Hungarian nobleman and prince (House of Árpád) (b. 1268)
- Geoffrey Chauderon, Latin nobleman and Grand Constable
- Lancelot de Saint-Maard, French nobleman and marshal
- Lanxi Daolong, Chinese-born monk and calligrapher (b. 1213)
- Lý Chiêu Hoàng, Vietnamese empress consort (b. 1218)
- Martin of Opava (or Poland), Polish bishop and chronicler
- Stephen II Báncsa, Hungarian prelate and bishop (b. 1240)
- Tudur ap Ednyfed Fychan, Welsh nobleman and politician
- Ubertino Pallavicini, Italian nobleman (House of Pallavicini)
