= Siege of Vredelant =

Siege in the Netherlands (1279–1280)

Siege of Vreeland
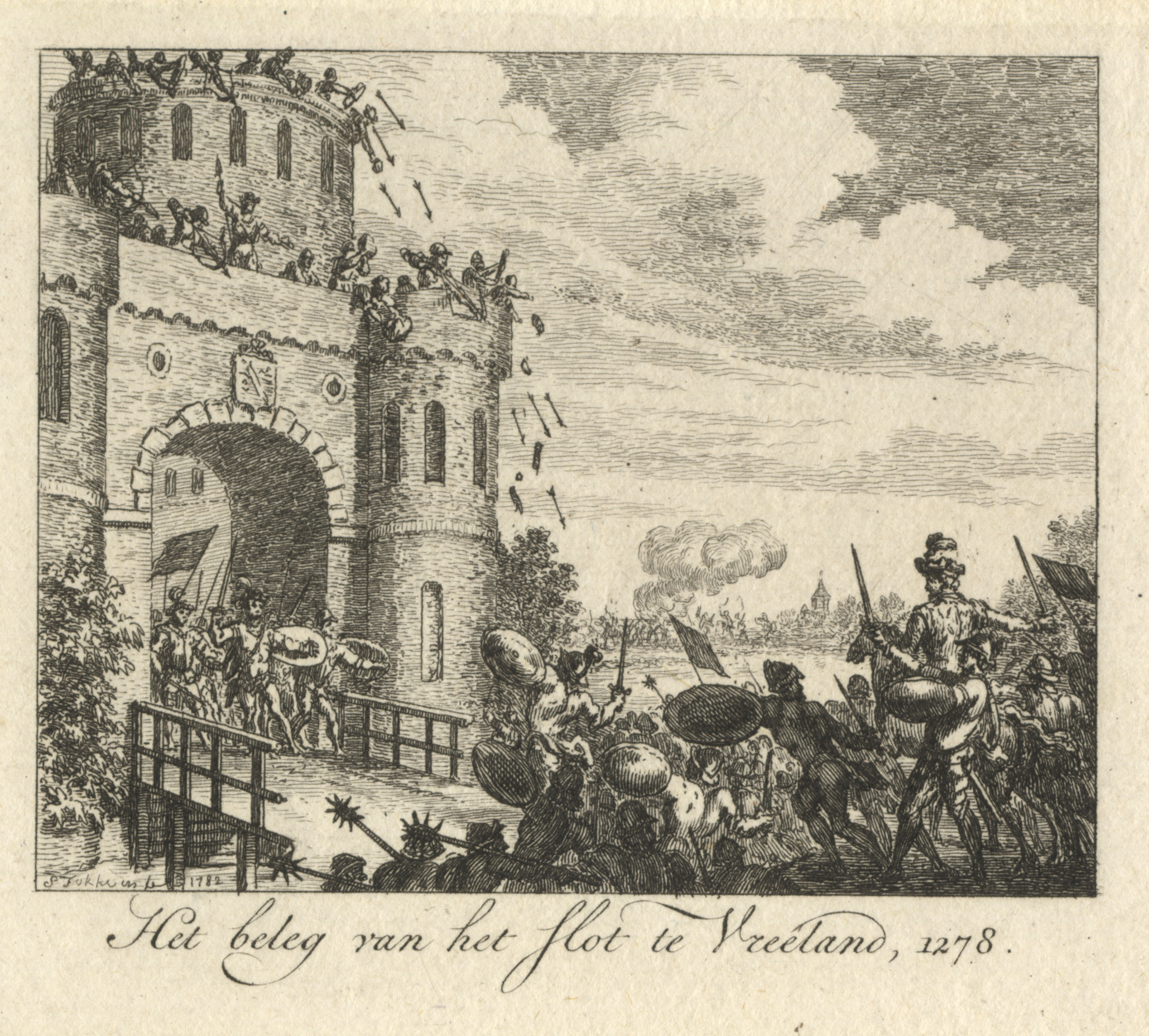
- 18th-century image by Simon Fokke depicting the siege of Vredelant
Date	1279 – 1280
Location	Vreeland, Prince-Bishopric of Utrecht
Result	Victory for Floris V of Holland

Belligerents
County of Holland; Prince-Bishopric of Utrecht	Van Amstel family

Commanders and leaders
Count Floris V of Holland; Bishop-Elect John I of Nassau; Costijn van Renesse	Gijsbrecht IV van Amstel; Arent van Amstel

Strength
400+	1,000+

The siege of Vredelant (Dutch: Beleg van Vredelant) took place from late 1279 to 1280 and was fought between Floris V of Holland and Bishop-Elect John I of Nassau on one side and the rebellious Van Amstel family on the other side. The castle of Vredelant was taken within weeks when Gijsbrecht IV van Amstel was captured by the count's soldiers.

== Background ==
In the 1260s the bishop of Utrecht, Henry I van Vianden built a castle on the Vecht river in the Amstelland near the border with Holland. This way he could keep an eye on the rebellious lords of Amstel and control trade from and to Utrecht on the river.

Eventually, Gijsbrecht IV van Amstel rose up against the weaker successor of Henry of Vianden, the bishop-elect John I of Nassau, during the Kennemer uprising in 1273. The nobleman led an army of farmers, who destroyed multiple castles and besieged the city of Haarlem before moving on to Utrecht. There they were let in by the guilds, and the bishop-elect was forced to flee to Deventer. The city would stay under the guilds' control until September 1276, when it was recaptured by bishopric forces led by Zweder van Beusichem. The bishop-elect returned to the city two years later.

To repay his debts caused by the uprising, among other things, he pawned the castles of Montfoort, Vreeland, and Ter Horst to the lord of Woerden Herman VI van Woerden, the lord of Amstelland Gijsbrecht IV van Amstel and the lord of Cuijk Jan I van Cuijk respectively.

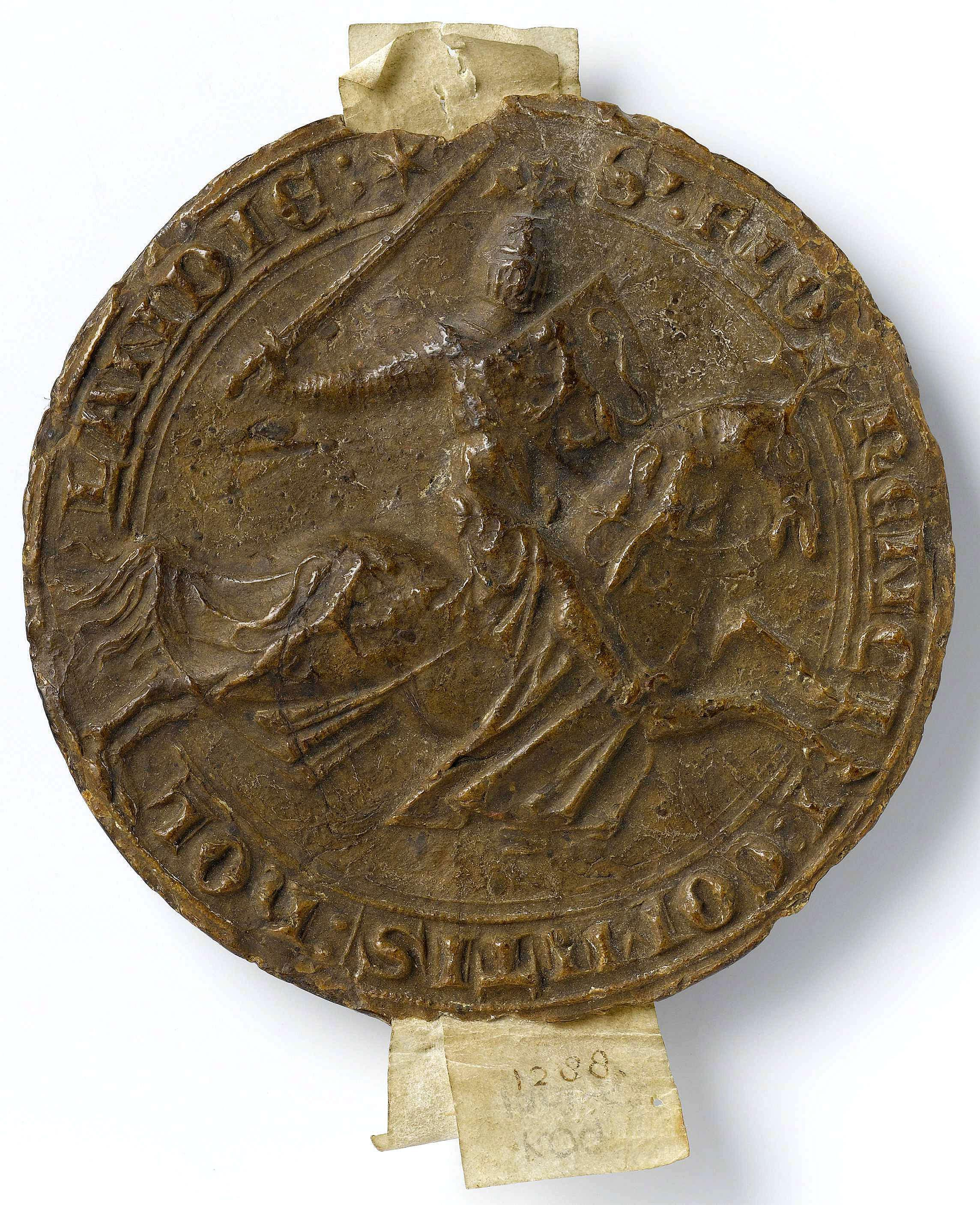
The seal of Floris V, Count of Holland

This quickly caused problems, when Van Amstel levied a toll on the Vecht river, John I of Nassau tried to repay the 1824 pounds he borrowed from Van Amstel, but the lord refused to leave the castle. Floris V, the count of Holland, stepped in to mediate. Advised by the lords Simon van Haarlem, Drik van Teilingen, Gerard van Wateringen, Jan II van Renesse, Diederik van Zanthorst and the burgrave of Leiden, on 21 January 1279 he decided that Van Amstel had one year to return the castle to the bishop-elect. Unhappy with this ruling, John I of Nassau mustered an army and set off for Vredelant. Eventually, Gijsbrecht van Amstel met the bishop-elect in battle at the Soester Eng that same year. The bishopric army almost defeated Van Amstels' soldiers, but at the last moment Herman van Woerden arrived with reinforcements and turned the tide of the battle. The soldiers of the Prince-Bishopric of Utrecht fled to nearby Amersfoort and the rebellious lords claimed victory, but Herman van Woerden was gravely wounded. Some sources say that the battle took place on the Zweser Eng in Zuilen. The defeated John I of Nassau turned to the count of Holland, Floris V, to help him deal with the two noblemen. The count seized this opportunity to gain more influence in the Prince-Bishopric, and on the 26th of Juli 1279 the bishop-elect bestowed the de facto control of the region upon Floris V.

== Siege ==
When Floris V surrounded the castle, it was Gijsbrecht's brother Arnoud or Arent van Amstel, the lord of Benschop, Polsbroek, and IJsselstein who was defending the castle. The count had an army of soldiers from both Holland and Zeeland, commanded by Costijn van Renesse. Despite his numerical advantage, Floris V did not storm the castle, because he knew Gijsbrecht van Amstel would attempt to relieve his brother. When the rebellious nobleman did so with around 1000 men, and 400 men under Costijn van Renesse met him on the battlefield, fighting broke out at Loenen. Chronicler Melis Stoke describes the scene in his Rijmkroniek:

De heer van Aemstelle zette toe
Ende gaderde wat hi gaderen mochte:
Thuys tontsettene was sijn ghedochte,
Ende quam te Loenen op enen dach.
Doe sgraven volc dat versach,
Bespraken si hem ende berieden,
Dat si een deel van haren lieden
Lieten ligghen voer deen casteel
Ende voeren voert met volc een deel;
Dander hadden volcs so vele,
Dat onghelike sceen te sulken spele.
Doe si haer lieden hadden ghescaert,
Ghinghen si voert onvervaert
Die selve lieden, de der waren,
Ende doorvochten dandre scaren.
Daer wort heer Ghisebrecht ghevaen;
Dander worden also ondaen
Ende ghesconfiert altemale.
Wat holpe hierof langhe tale?

Translation:

The lord of Amstel moved near
And gatherd what he could gather
To relieve the castle was his thought
And he came to Loenen one day
When the count's folk realised that
They discussed him and deliberated
That a part of their people they
Would leave at the castle
And would advance with their people a part
The other side had so many people
That it almost looked like a game.
When they had positioned their men,
They went on undaunted
The same men, that were there,
And fought off the other force.
There lord Gijsbrecht was captured;
The others were so defeated
And completely conquered.
What would a long tale help here?

When a herald accompanied by the sound of trumpets brought the captured lord to the moat, Arent van Amstel surrendered the castle, on the condition that he and his brother would be kept alive. Floris V accepted, and Vredelant fell. The lords of Amstelland were brought to Zeeland, where they would be imprisoned until 1285.

The siege is said to last two weeks, and although the exact dates of the siege can't be confirmed, charters released by the count of Holland show he was at Vreeland from 3 May until 14 May.

== Aftermath ==
When Floris V captured Vredelant, he quickly advanced to Montfoort, held by Herman VI van Woerden. The nobleman fled, and after a siege lasting almost a year, the count managed to capture this castle as well.

The bishop-elect had to cover all costs made by the two sieges, and became indebted to Floris V even further. The count of Holland took the newly captured regions of Amstelland and Woerden as collateral.

Eventually, Gijsbrecht and Arent van Amstel were released in 1285, and regained their status as influential lords, only this time they swore allegiance to Floris V instead of John I of Nassau. Herman van Woerden returned under similar circumstances.

== See also ==
- Floris V
- Gijsbrecht IV van Amstel
- Kennemer uprising
