= Siege of Montfoort =

Siege in the 13th century in the Netherlands

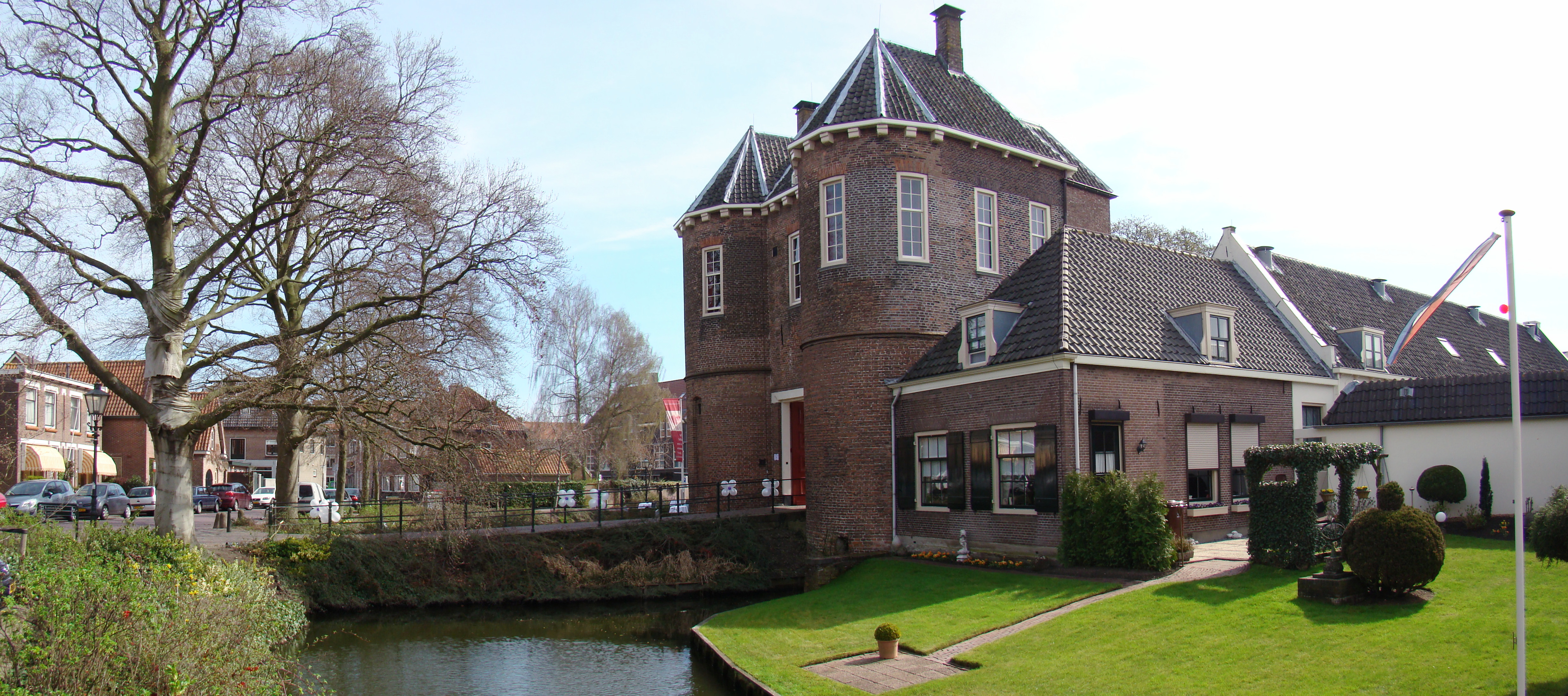
Date	1280
Location	Montfoort, Prince-Bishopric of Utrecht (present-day Utrecht, Netherlands)
Result	Victory for Floris V of Holland

Belligerents
County of Holland; Prince-Bishopric of Utrecht	Woerden

Commanders and leaders
Count Floris V of Holland; John I, Bishop-Elect of Utrecht	Herman VI van Woerden

The siege of Montfoort took place in 1280 when Count Floris V of Holland attacked the castle of lord Herman VI van Woerden at Montfoort in the Prince-Bishopric of Utrecht. The siege ended after half a year when the soldiers inside the castle surrendered. The primary source for the siege is the Rijmkroniek van Holland by Melis Stoke.

== Prelude ==
In 1274, during the Kennemer uprising, Utrecht was captured by rebelling forces led by Gijsbrecht IV van Amstel, and Bishop-elect John I of Nassau was forced to flee the city. Over the course of two years, he tried to recapture Utrecht and eventually succeeded in 1276 with the help of his marshal Zweder van Beusichem. Because of this, he needed money to pay his soldiers but lacked the funds to do so. He used the tithe meant for the Crusades, which resulted in an excommunication. Furthermore, he had to pawn the castles Vreeland and Montfoort to his enemies Gijsbrecht IV van Amstel and Herman VI van Woerden respectively in the late 1270s. These nobles had rebelled multiple times in the past. Problems quickly arose when Gijsbrecht van Amstel levied a toll at Vreeland that same year. Floris V of Holland had to step in to mediate. The count had helped the bishop-elect during the Kennemer uprising and hoped to expand his influence in the region. He decided Van Amstel had one year to leave the castle. When the nobleman refused, Floris V prepared to attack the castle.

Meanwhile, Herman VI of Woerden also refused to leave the castle of Montfoort. He and Van Amstel were cousins, and whenever the lord of Amstelland rebelled, the lord of Woerden quickly followed suit. The Siege of Vredelant swiftly ended, but Van Woerden had had time to prepare his defenses. As the count of Holland marched towards Montfoort, the nobleman fled, and would only return to Holland in 1288.

== The siege ==
In the spring of 1280, after they captured Vreeland in early May, the forces from Holland arrived at Montfoort. They stormed the castle daily, using so-called "magnelen" and 'other instruments to damage and destroy that castle'. Dutch historians Jacob van Lennep and Willem Jacob Hofdijk describe the siege in their book Merkwaardige Kasteelen in Nederland as the following:

Byna een jaar lang boden de belegerden een moedigen en hardnekkigen tegenstand aan het staal der Grafelijke wapenknechten, even als de muren van het kasteel aan blyde en stormram. Telkens vinniger trokken de Hollanders, by het schetteren der klaroenen, by het kraken en dreunen hunner geschut- en beukwerktuigen, ten storm; sloegen hunne ladders aan de wallen, en stegen by hoopen onder beschutting van het schilddak op -- telkens werden zy met bebloede koppen te rug geworpen

For almost a year the besieged put up a brave and tenacious resistance to the steal of the soldiers of the Count, just as the walls of the castle to the magonel and ram. Constantly fiercer the Hollanders stormed, at the sounding of the clarions, at the creaking and booming of their artillery- and ramminginstruments; put their ladders up against the walls, and climbed bunch by bunch under protection of a shield -- they were thrown back with bloodied heads again and again

Charters released by Floris V show he was at Montfoort from the 8th of July 1280, but later that year he is in Egmond. After the count left, the siege maintained its intensity. Melis Stoke mentions that "many a heavy stone from trebuchets" were thrown. Because of this, the defenders of the castle tried in vain to negotiate terms of surrender with the soldiers of Holland. Eventually, as winter set in, the attackers managed to breach the castle walls. The count's soldiers cried "Holland!" and entered the courtyard. In the chaos that ensued, all but two defenders were beheaded. This was not uncommon at the time. The banner of Holland was raised over the keep.

== Aftermath ==
Floris V ordered his soldiers to occupy the castle. It would remain under control of the count until the 2nd of October 1285, when all properties belonging to the Prince-Bishopric were returned. Floris V wanted to give the castle to a nobleman from Brabant, called Hendrik de Rover. Eventually, he married into the family that owned Montfoort, and so founded the House of Montfoort. The De Rover family would own the castle until 1580.

Herman VI van Woerden would only return to Holland in 1288, when he reconciled with the count. He would later assassinate Floris V with Gijsbrecht IV van Amstel.
