= Willem II Berthout =

Bishop of Utrecht

Willem II
- Bishop of Utrecht
- Church: Catholic Church
- Diocese: Utrecht
- In office: 1296–1301

Personal details
- Died: 4 July 1301

Willem II Berthout of Mechelen (died near De Meern, 4 July 1301), also Guilhelmus or Wilhelmus, served as Bishop of Utrecht from 1296 until his death in battle in 1301. He succeeded Jan II van Sierck. Willem was a leader of the Berthout family, which ruled over the Heerlijkheid of Mechelen.

William was appointed without intervention from the chapters by pope Boniface VIII because of his anti-French and pro-English attitude. He tried in vain to get back his lost lordships of Amstelland and Woerden until the death of count Floris V of Holland. When he returned from a trip to Rome he found so much opposition to him in the Sticht that he sought refuge in Amersfoort. In 1300 Boniface VIII suspended him as bishop since he had not paid back debts owed to the papal treasury, but when he paid these debts the suspension was lifted and he remained bishop until his death in battle against a coalition of the Dutch and his own rebellious subjects. His intended successor as bishop, Adolf II of Waldeck, was passed over in favour of Guy of Avesnes.

Catholic Church titles
Preceded by Jan II van Sierck	Bishop of Utrecht; 1296–1301	Succeeded by Guy of Avesnes
