= Gerard van Velsen =

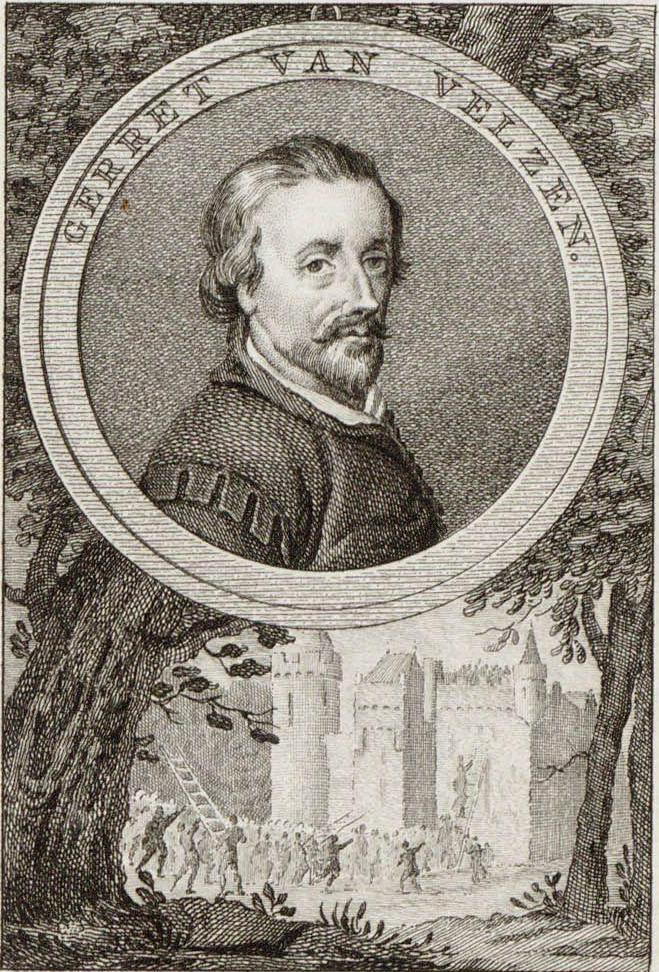
Gerard de van Velzen as imagined in the 19th century

Gerard de van Velzen (died 1296) was lord of Beverwijk, Noordwijk, and Velsen.

He was the son of Albrecht van Velsen and Hildegonde. He was married to Machteld van Woerden, a sister of Herman VI van Woerden. In 1275, Van Velzen was named schout of Wijk aan Zee.

In 1296, Van Velzen conspired with Herman VI van Woerden, Gijsbrecht IV of Amstel, Jan van Kuyk, and Arnold van Benschop to kidnap Floris V, Count of Holland to bring him to trial from the king in Europe. Eventually, together with Van Woerden and Van Amstel, they imprisoned the count in the Muiderslot. After Floris V attempted to escape he accidentally killed the count, stabbing him 20 times. Afterwards he fled to castle Kronenburg near Loenen aan de Vecht. A few days later, he was arrested and brought to Leiden to stand trial. There, he was tortured for three days before being quartered.

His motive for the kidnap was Floris' supposed rape of Van Velzen's spouse, after which she committed suicide.
