= John II van Sierck =

- Bishop of Toul
- Church: Catholic Church
- Diocese: Toul
- In office: 1296–1305
- Previous post: Bishop of Utrecht

Personal details
- Died: 1305

John or Jan van Sierck (or Zyrick) (died 1305) served as Bishop of Toul from 1296 until his death in 1305. He had previously served as Bishop of Utrecht from 1291 to 1296.

John van Sierck was archdeacon in Treis-Karden in the Archbishopric of Trier, and papal chaplain. In 1291 he was named bishop of Utrecht by Pope Nicholas IV, without prior election by the Utrecht Chapters. Despite a strong rule, in which he reformed the ecclesiastic law, John was unable to remove Utrecht from the influence of Floris V, Count of Holland, a legacy of his predecessor John I of Nassau.

John set up public notaries and was in constant conflict with the city of Utrecht. In 1296 he was moved to the Bishopric of Toul, where he ruled as John I. It is unclear if the move was voluntary, or was done to make way for a successor that was more inclined to an alliance between the County of Flanders and England.

Catholic Church titles
Preceded by John I, Bishop-Elect of Utrecht	Bishop of Utrecht; 1291–1296	Succeeded by Willem II Berthout
Preceded by Konrad Probus	Bishop of Toul; 1296–1305	Succeeded by Vito Venosa
