= John I, Bishop-Elect of Utrecht =

John I
- Bishop-Elect of Utrecht
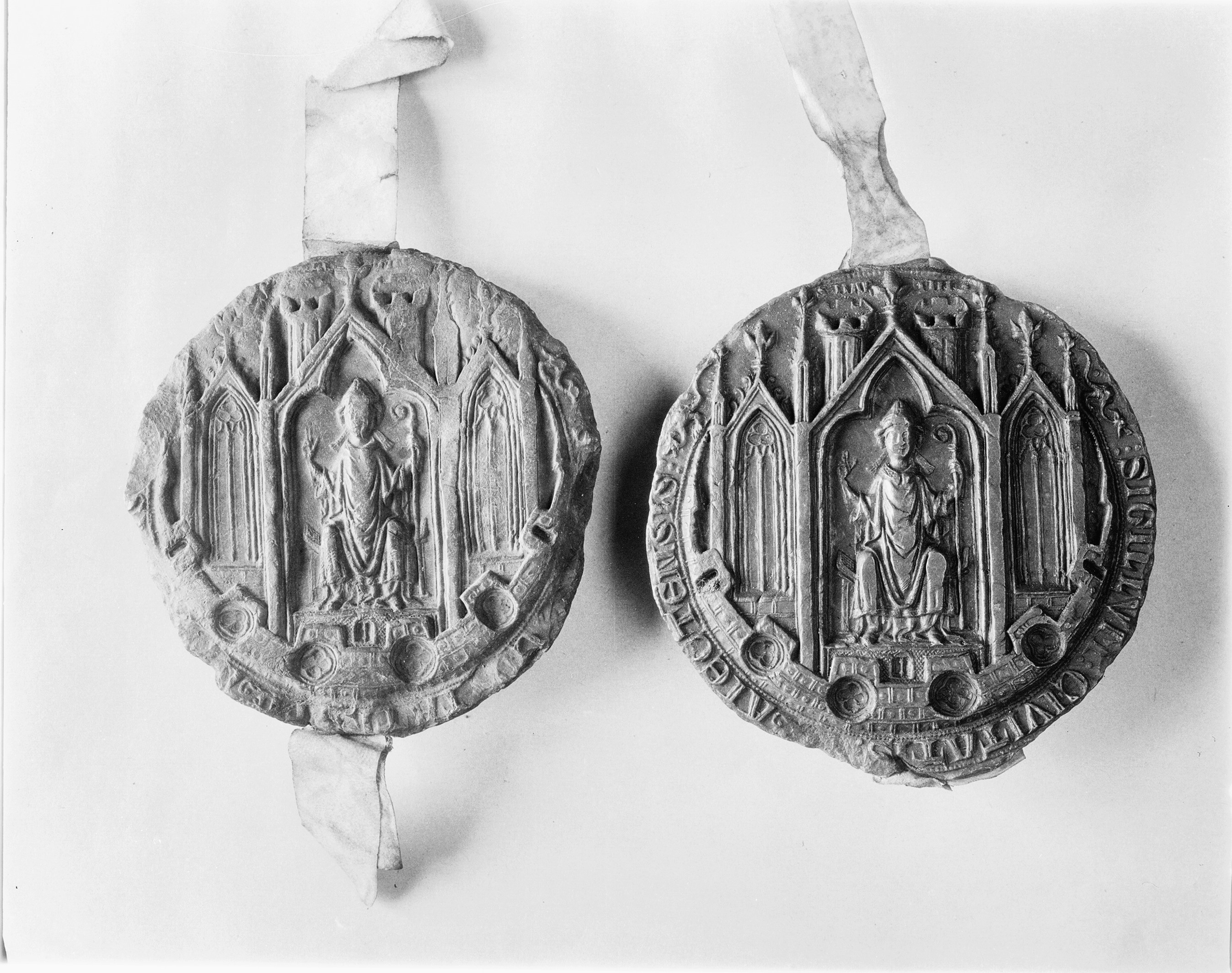
- John possibly depicted on two seals of the city Utrecht
- Church: Catholic Church
- Diocese: Diocese of Utrecht
- In office: 1267–1290
- Predecessor: Henry I van Vianden
- Successor: John II van Sierck

Personal details
- Born: Unknown
- Died: 13 July 1309 Deventer

Coat of Arms of the Bishopric of Utrecht

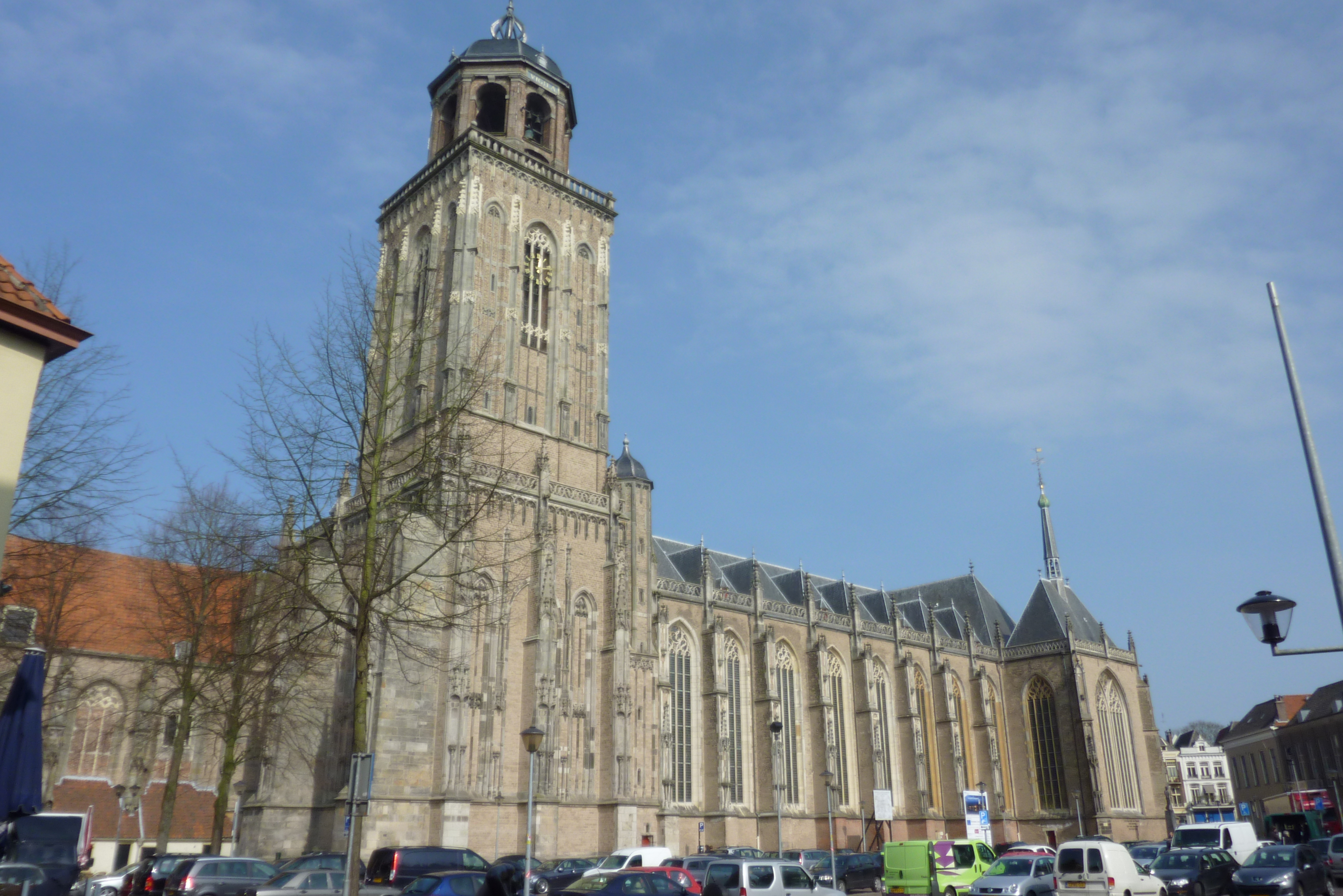
The Lebuinus Church in Deventer

John of Nassau (German: Johann von Nassau; Dutch: Jan van Nassau; died 13 July 1309) was a clergyman from the House of Nassau. From 1267 to 1290 he was Bishop-Elect of the Bishopric of Utrecht as John I. He did not care much for his spiritual functions, and his government also failed due to his weak political and poor financial management. During his reign, the influence of the County of Holland in the Bishopric greatly increased. John's government was one of the worst the Bishopric had to endure; without talent and energy, slavishly surrendering to all sensual pleasures, it was never possible for him to maintain the inner peace, under which the Nedersticht in particular suffered greatly.

== Life ==
John was the sixth son of Count Henry II of Nassau and Matilda of Guelders and Zutphen, the youngest daughter of Count Otto I of Guelders and Zutphen and Richardis of Bavaria. John is first mentioned in a charter from 1247. From 1262 to 1265, he was archdeacon of Condroz.

Under the influence of his cousin Count Otto II of Guelders, John was elected successor to Henry I van Vianden in 1267 as Bishop of Utrecht. As Pope Clement IV (at the instigation of the Archbishop of Cologne) disagreed with this choice, John was never ordained a Bishop and remained Bishop-Elect. For this reason he joined Otto II of Guelders at his war against the Archbishop of Cologne, but John could not offer his cousin essential help. For a year after his election, marauding gangs of insurgents from North-Holland, who furiously resisted their nobles, destroyed many castles and finally appeared before the city Utrecht, which they obtained with the help of the poorters, so that John first had to flee to Guelders and then to the Oversticht. When the marauders withdrew from Utrecht in 1268, the townspeople, whom he besieged with assistance of Guelders, refused him entrance, so that he was forced to move his seat to Deventer until 1270. With the help of Otto II of Guelders and Zweder of Beusichem, he again took possession of Amersfoort and Utrecht, but in order to restore order he needed the help of Count Floris V of Holland, who took this opportunity to create a decisive influence on the Bishopric from that moment on. With the death of Otto II of Guelders in 1271, John lost his most important supporter.

In the west of the Bishopric, the Lords of Amstel and the Lords of Woerden sought an autonomous position between Holland and the Bishopric, they opportunistically accepted any help. In 1274 Gijsbrecht IV of Amstel saw an opportunity to defeat John definitively in the uprising of the peasants from Kennemerland, Waterland and West-Frisia. Gijsbrecht placed himself at the head of the rebels and went with them to the city Utrecht, where they brought the guilds to power. Then the rebels withdrew. John asked Floris V to recapture the city and restore the former form of government. Marshal Zweder of Beusichem's attempt to conquer the city succeeded in September 1276. He attacked at dawn, and after heavy street fights the city fell into his hands. John had fled to Deventer and could return to Utrecht. Two years later there again was unrest in the city, after which Nicholas of Kats, a nobleman from Zeeland, at the request of Floris V, took the city again.

In the meantime, however, John had become so burdened with debts that in 1276 he had to pledge the castles of Vreeland, Montfoort and Ter Horst – which actually had to defend the borders of the Bishopric – to his vassals: Vreeland Castle to Gijsbrecht IV of Amstel, Montfoort Castle to Herman VI of Woerden, and Castle Ter Horst to John I of Cuijk. This made the Bishop-Elect powerless and he urgently needed money. In 1278 he therefore seized the proceeds of the tithes for the crusade from the Dominican convent in Utrecht, which earned him the everlasting hatred of the ecclesiastical authorities.

Jan called in the help of Floris V, who financially helped the elect in 1278 in order to be able to repay the pledge. Floris V agreed with the city council of Utrecht on 5 September 1278 that he would govern the city with a mixed council.

At the pledge in 1276, Gijsbrecht IV of Amstel had stipulated that he only had to return Vreeland Castle one year after the repayment of the pledge. However, when Gijsbrecht still refused to transfer Vreeland Castle to John in the beginning of 1280, the elect first tried, in vain, to capture Vreeland Castle by military means. Floris V then besieged Vreeland Castle in May 1280 and took Gijsbrecht prisoner. Floris V then moved to Montfoort Castle and conquered that too. In January 1281 Floris V presented John the bill for the acts of war: 4000 pounds for Amstelland and 2000 pounds for Woerden. Because John did not have that amount, he pledged these areas to Floris V, who thereby considerably increased his control in Utrecht. John did retain some power in the Oversticht because Count Reginald I of Guelders was mainly concerned with the War of the Limburg Succession.

In 1288, when John undertook the rebuilding of the St. Martin's Cathedral in Utrecht, which had burned down in 1248, he gave visitors a 180-day indulgence.

In 1290 John was deposed by Pope Nicholas IV on the basis of a whole list of allegations; they do not seem to have been of a moral nature. John settled in Deventer, where he died on 13 July 1309. He was buried in the Lebuinus Church there.

== Descendants ==
John fathered four illegitimate children, the name of the mother is unknown:

1. John of Nassau (killed in action in front of the Nordenberghepoort at Zwolle, 4 June 1352). He married first to Frieda van Appeldoorn (died 4 July 1350) and second to Ermgard ter Oy (listed on 4 June 1352).
2. Jacob of Nassau (died 21 March after 1340). He married a certain Nenta (listed as widow in 1350). From this marriage:
  1. Everhard of Nassau (died 7 December 1390). He was canon in Deventer in 1350 and vicar in the Lebuinus Church in Deventer.
3. Otto (listed in Deventer in 1320).
4. Matilda (died Deventer, 1350). She was married to J. Vrijherte.

== Sources ==
- Bredero, A.H. (1982). "Het godsdienstig leven circa 1050-1384" [The religious life around 1050-1384]. Algemene Geschiedenis der Nederlanden [General History of the Netherlands] (in Dutch). Vol. Deel 3. Haarlem: Fibula-Van Dishoeck. pp. 212–248. ISBN 90-228-3804-8.
- Cordfunke, E.H.P. (2013) [2011]. Floris V. Een politieke moord in 1296 [Floris V. A political murder in 1296] (in Dutch) (2nd revised ed.). Zutphen: Walburg Pers. ISBN 978-90-5730-926-7.
- Dek, A.W.E. (1970). Genealogie van het Vorstenhuis Nassau [Genealogy of the Royal House of Nassau] (in Dutch). Zaltbommel: Europese Bibliotheek. OCLC 27365371.
- Graaf, Ronald P. de (1996). Oorlog om Holland 1000-1375 [War around Holland 1000-1375] (in Dutch). Hilversum: Uitgeverij Verloren. ISBN 90-6550-278-5.
- Jansen, H.P.H. (1982). "Holland, Zeeland en het Sticht 1100-1433" [Holland, Zeeland and the Sticht 1100-1433]. Algemene Geschiedenis der Nederlanden [General History of the Netherlands] (in Dutch). Vol. Deel 2. Haarlem: Fibula-Van Dishoeck. pp. 281–323. ISBN 90-228-3802-1.
- Milis, L. (1982). "De Kerk tussen de Gregoriaanse hervorming en Avignon" [The Church between the Gregorian reform and Avignon]. Algemene Geschiedenis der Nederlanden [General History of the Netherlands] (in Dutch). Vol. Deel 3. Haarlem: Fibula-Van Dishoeck. pp. 165–211. ISBN 90-228-3804-8.
- Mulder, Liek, ed. (1994). Lexicon geschiedenis van Nederland en België [Lexicon history of the Netherlands and Belgium] (in Dutch). Utrecht/Antwerpen: Kosmos – Z&K Uitgevers. ISBN 90-215-2357-4.
- Vorsterman van Oyen, A.A. (1882). Het vorstenhuis Oranje-Nassau. Van de vroegste tijden tot heden [The Royal House of Orange-Nassau. From the earliest days until the present] (in Dutch). Leiden & Utrecht: A.W. Sijthoff & J.L. Beijers.
- Wenzelburger, Karl Theodor (1881). "Johann I. von Nassau" [John I of Nassau]. Allgemeine Deutsche Biographie [Universal German Biography] (in German). Vol. Band 14. Leipzig: Duncker & Humblot. p. 430.

Religious titles
Preceded by Henry I van Vianden	Bishop of Utrecht; 1267 – 1290	Succeeded by John II van Sierck
