= Ter Horst Castle =

Coordinates: 52°7′28″N 6°1′45″E

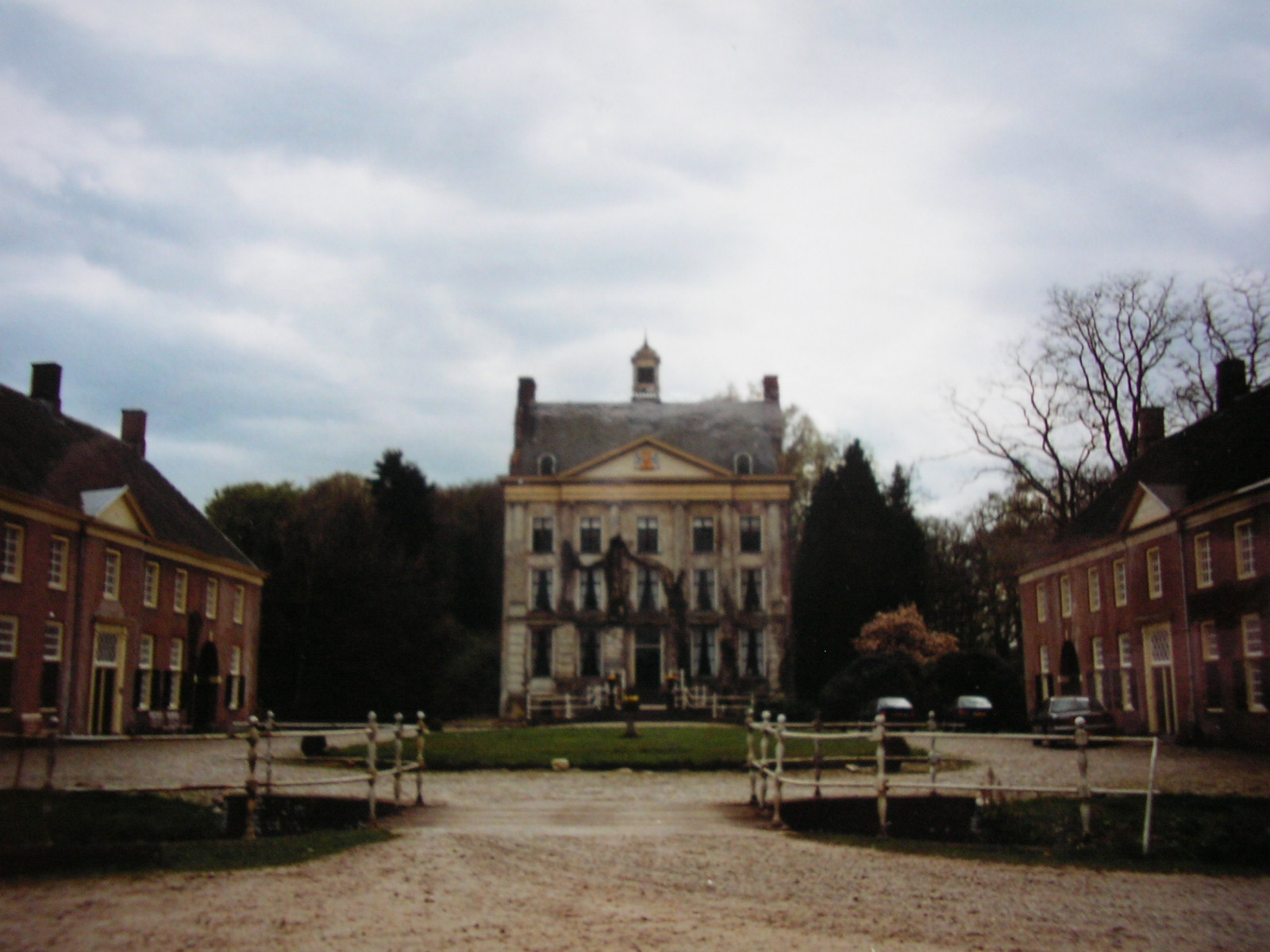
Kasteel Ter Horst

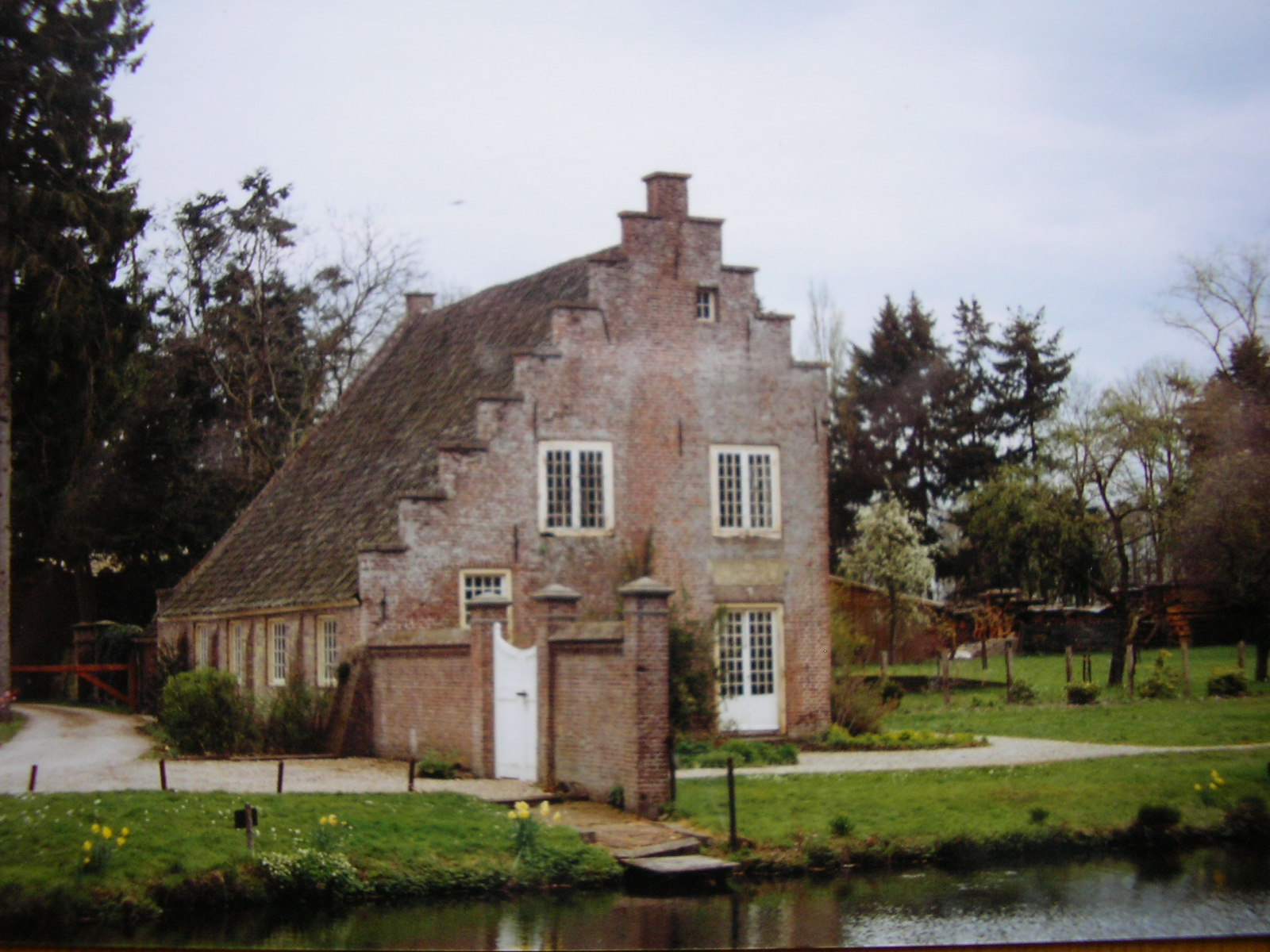
Oranjerie van kasteel Ter Horst

Ter Horst Castle is a castle northeast of the village of Loenen, in the Dutch province of Gelderland, on the road to Klarenbeek. In 1557, the then mayor of Arnhem Wynant Hacfort had the castle built.

== History ==
Already before 1557 there was a castle of the Duke of Gelre, where the rent of the Veluwe (in kind) was stored. The floors of the cellars of Ter Horst castle consist of stones from 1300. But the house that stood here at that time would have been destroyed during battles around 1354. After this destruction, Ter Horst was a farm until Wynant Hacfort, then mayor of Arnhem, had a castle built there in 1557. This castle had top façades on both side façades and on the entrance façade, which are typical for this time. The house was rebuilt around 1791 and given its current façade. This has a stately neoclassical style and consists of natural stone. Due to this renovation, which was carried out by architect Roelof Roelofs Viervant, the former rear became the front and vice versa. In addition, the current forecourt, the outbuildings and a bridge between the castle and the forecourt were laid during this renovation. In the left annex is a former shelter, which served as a Roman Catholic church for Loenen. The chapel has a striking altar with special marble paintings from 1792.

The orangery used to be used as a granary, this barn was already there before the Ter Horst house was built. At that time this barn probably served as a church, this seems likely because church lists from 1557 indicate that there was a church in the diocese of Deventer on the estate of Ter Horst castle.

Bishop of Utrecht Frederik van Blankenheim died on 9 October 1423 at this location.

== Residents ==
The Hacfort family has owned Ter Horst for seven generations. In 1862 the house came into the possession of the Van Wijnbergen family through a marriage. The Van Lynden family and the Van Leeuwen family subsequently became owners of the castle. In 1933 the house and estate were bought by Hendrik Russelman. Since then, the house remained in the possession of his family until today.

Until 1927 the lord of the castle was also the owner of the nearby centuries-old water mill and paper mill 'De Middelste Molen'.

Nowadays Kasteel ter Horst is inhabited by the Russelman and Schoonderwoerd families. There can also be married in a specially decorated wedding room.
