= Kennemer uprising =

Farmers' Uprising in the Netherlands

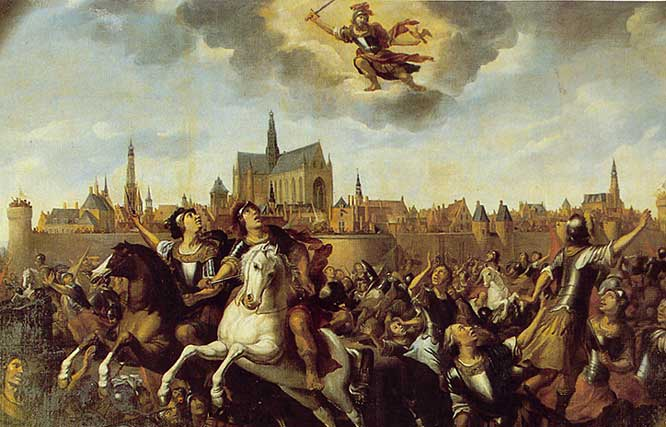
Date	1272–1274
Location	County of Holland and Prince-Bishopric of Utrecht, Holy Roman Empire

Belligerents
Farmers of Kennemerland & Waterland; Amstelland; The Guilds of Utrecht	County of Holland; Prince-Bishopric of Utrecht; Citizens of Haarlem

Commanders and leaders
Gijsbrecht IV van Amstel	Floris V, Count of Holland; John I, Bishop-Elect of Utrecht; Jan Persijn

The Kennemer uprising (Dutch: Kennemer Opstand) was a rebellion of farmers in the County of Holland and Prince-Bishopric of Utrecht in the Holy Roman Empire, that took place between 1272 and 1274. The commoners or huislieden from the Kennemerland, a bailiwick within the County of Holland, rose up against their bailiff and the other nobles. The movement spread to the nearby West Friesland, Waterland and Amstelland. The lord of Amstelland, Gijsbrecht IV of Amstel decided to join the insurrenction and became the leader of the Kennemers. Later Utrecht, Amersfoort and Eemland also joined. Eventually, the Kennemers were defeated.

== Background ==
In 1256, Willem II of Holland died in the Battle of Hoogwoud during his campaign against the Frisians, and his son, Floris V, who was 2 years old at the time, inherited the County of Holland. Regents took custody of the county. When Floris was 12 years old, he was declared adult and came to power. In 1272, he vowed to avenge his father and invaded Frisia. This ultimately failed, and caused unrest among the farmers of the Kennemerland. They had been dissatisfied for longer, because they believed that they were burdened by the taxes, and that the nobility should also pay them. This anger would lead to the rebellion.

== Start of the uprising ==
Johannes de Beke wrote that the farmers rebelled tieghen die heren ende tieghen die welgheboren lude (against the lords and against the wellborn folk). They besieged Slot Heemskerk and Slot Oud-Haerlem, and the inhabitants fled to nearby Haarlem. Witnessing the success of the Kennemerlanders, the people of West-Friesland and Waterland joined the movement, and together they moved into Amstelland. Gijsbrecht IV of Amstel saw the opportunity to lead this 'army' and expand his territory. He quickly pledged allegiance to the farmers, and was subsequently made their hooftman. He wanted to remove his enemies from the nearby lands, and laid siege to Vredelant, but broke up his camp shortly after.

== Utrecht and Haarlem ==
In 1273, the Kennemers decided to move on Utrecht. When they arrived, the city guards feared the Tatars had come to plunder. One of the rebels spoke to the guards:

Ghi burgers, onse vriende, dat vrie volc van Kennemerlant, die groeten ju ende begheren volstandelike, dat ghi alle die edelinghe, die die meente te verswaren ende verdrucken pleghen, uut uwer stat verdrivet ende verbannet ende ghi hoer goet den armen luden ghevet

Citizens, our friends, the free people of Kennemerland, they greet thee and absolutely desire, that you drive away and ban every noble from your city, who weigh down and oppress the crowd and that you give all their goods to the poor folk

The farmers were let in by the members of the guilds, who believed they were also treated unfairly. They drove out almost 40 lords. After this, Amersfoort and Eemland joined Gijsbrecht and his army. The insurgents then moved onto Zeist, where John I, Bishop-Elect of Utrecht and his uncle Otto II, Count of Guelders were lying in wait of the army. After hearing of the spirit of the farmers, they decided to retreat to the Veluwe. Gijsbrecht took his army to the city of Haarlem, but in the meantime captured Castle Rijsenburg, Vianen Castle and Abcoude Castle.

When the farmers arrived at the city, they laid siege to it. This would last approximately 6 weeks. According to legend, Saint Bavo appeared over the walls and scared off the attackers, but it is more likely that a knight named Jan Persijn sortied, and with other soldiers set fire to several villages in the Kennemerland. The farmers, seeing their belongings go up in smoke, rushed back to their homesteads to rescue what little they had. They were pursued by the people of Haarlem, and some farmers were beaten to death, while others were hung on trees.

== Aftermath ==
After the Siege of Haarlem, the Bishop-Elect and Count returned to Utrecht, intent on capturing it. After four days, they realised it was futile, and captured Amersfoort instead. Utrecht would remain in control of the guilds until the 10th of September 1276, when Zweder van Beusichem, the Marshall of the Bishop, captured the city after heavy fighting.

Floris V made a treaty with the people of Kennemerland, and gave them the desired Landrecht in fear of them aiding the Frisians. They eventually did in 1492, when they rose up again, during the Bread and Cheese Revolt.

Gijsbrecht IV of Amstel made peace with the Count of Holland and Bishop of Utrecht. A few years later, in 1279, another war broke out with John I of Nassau. After an inniatal victory, Gijsbrecht was defeated, and his castle, Vredelant was taken from him. He was held prisoner in Zeeland, and was forced to submit to the Count of Holland, to whom he paid a sum of 2000 pounds as tribute. He later took part in a plot to assassinate Floris V.
