= Gijsbrecht van Aemstel (play) =

Play written by Joost van den Vondel

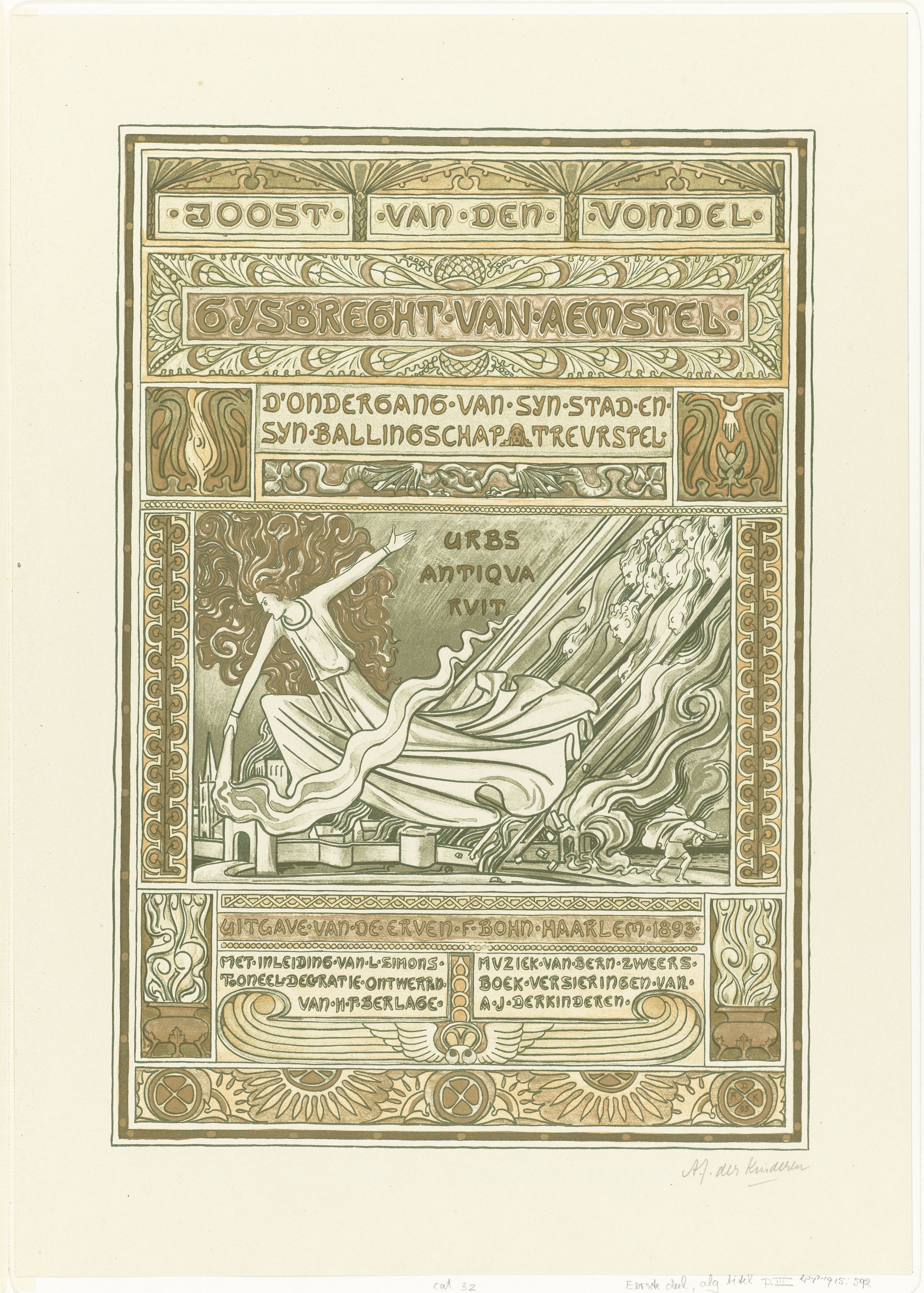
Gijsbrecht van Aemstel (1893 ed.)

Gijsbrecht van Aemstel (Dutch pronunciation: [ˈɣɛizbrɛxt fɑn ˈɑmstəl]) (Note: In isolation, van is pronounced [vɑn].) is a 17th-century history play by Joost van den Vondel, written to inaugurate Amsterdam's first city theatre. The first production was planned to take place on 26 December 1637, but was postponed until 3 January 1638. The piece was then performed annually (on New Year's Day) in Amsterdam until 1968.

== Plot ==
Set in 1304, it tells the story of the siege of Amsterdam and its surrounding towns, united by the Kennemers and Waterlanders. The reason for the siege is Gijsbrecht's alleged involvement in the abduction and manslaughter of Floris V in 1296.

The enemy soldiers appear to leave but smuggle themselves into the town, hidden in a cargo of firewood being shipped in by the citizens of Amsterdam. After a violent battle, Gijsbrecht is forced to flee to Prussia, to found a "New Holland" there.

== Historical accuracy ==
In reality, the nobleman who in 1304 invaded Amsterdam (to recover his position and possessions lost in 1296) was not Gijsbrecht IV (1235–1303), but his son Jan I of Amstel (1270–1345).

Historian Pim de Boer at the University of Groningen has found serious (though not entirely conclusive) indications that Gijsbrecht, with a few followers after his exile, founded Pruissisch Holland not far from Elbing (both now in Poland).

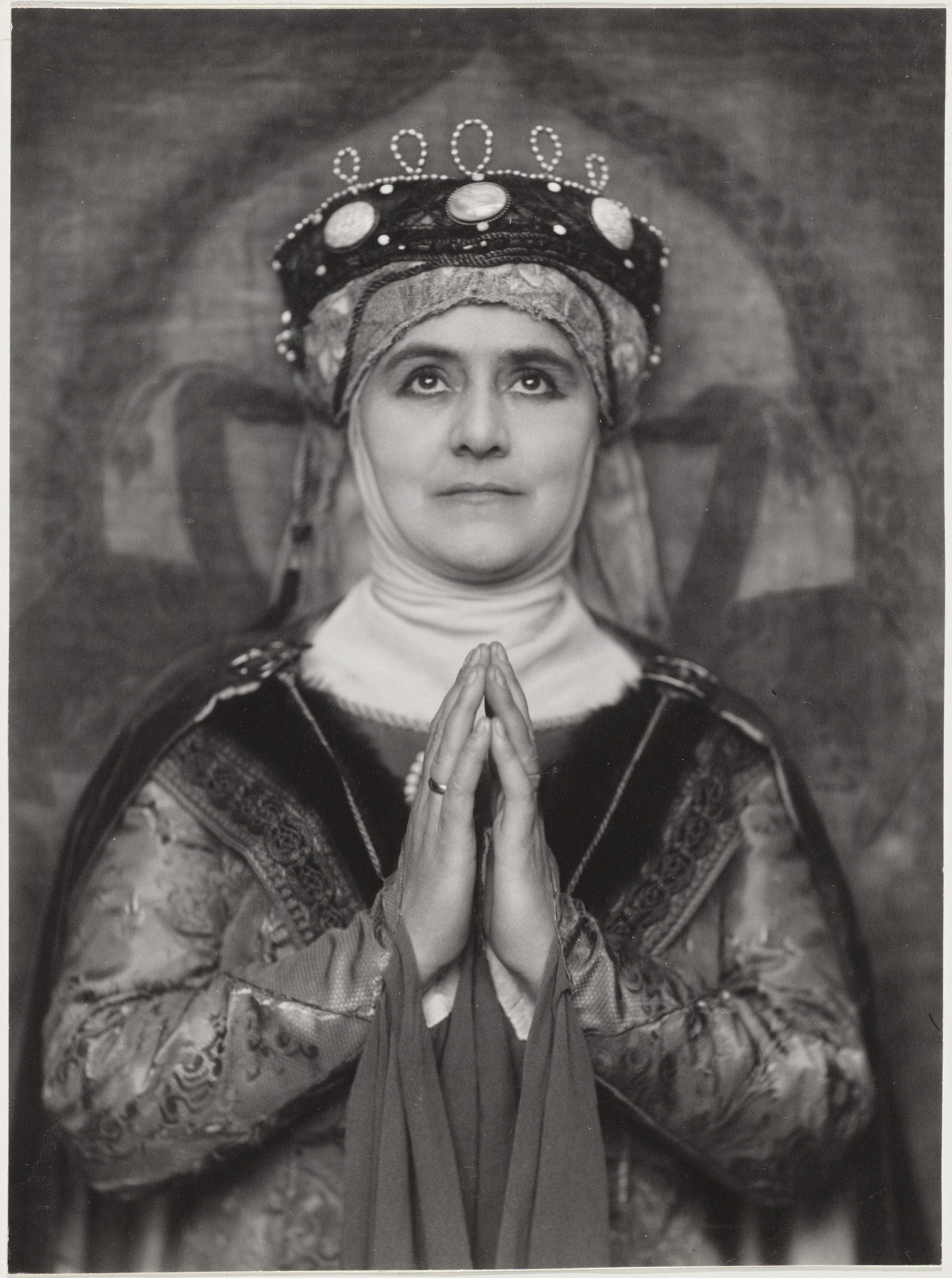
Badeloch (1917)

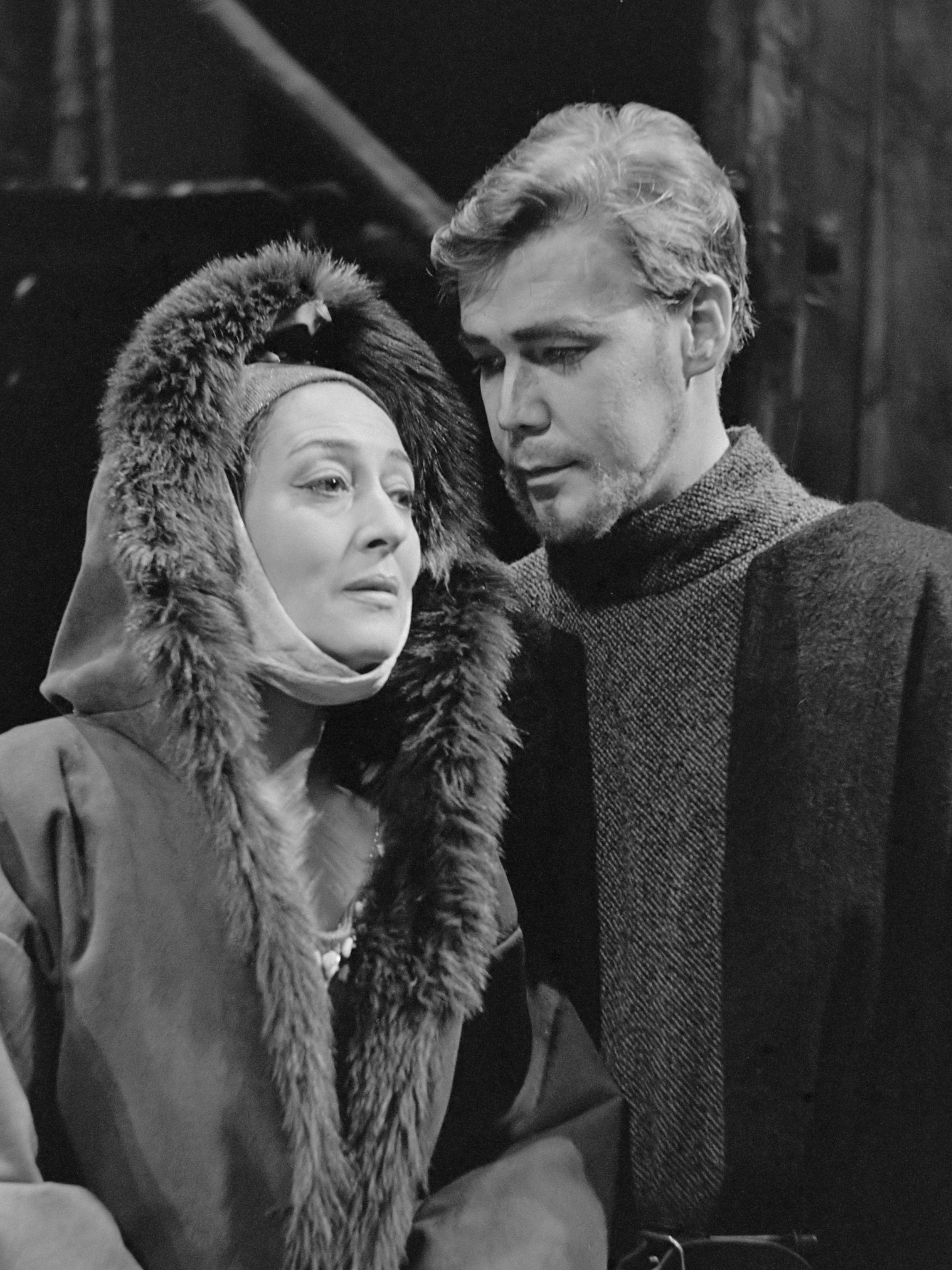
Badeloch & Gijsbrecht (1966)

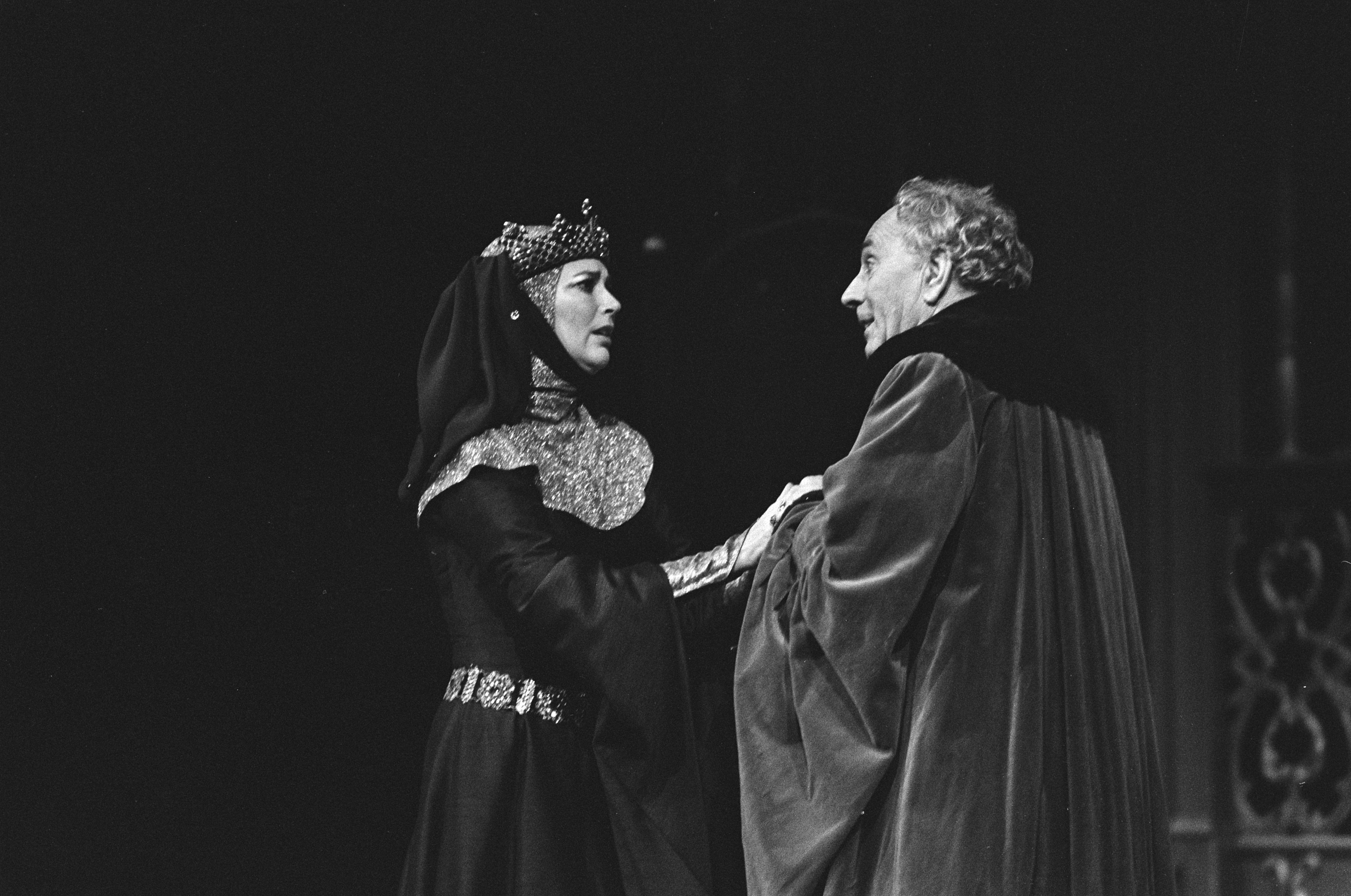
Badeloch & Gijsbrecht (1981)

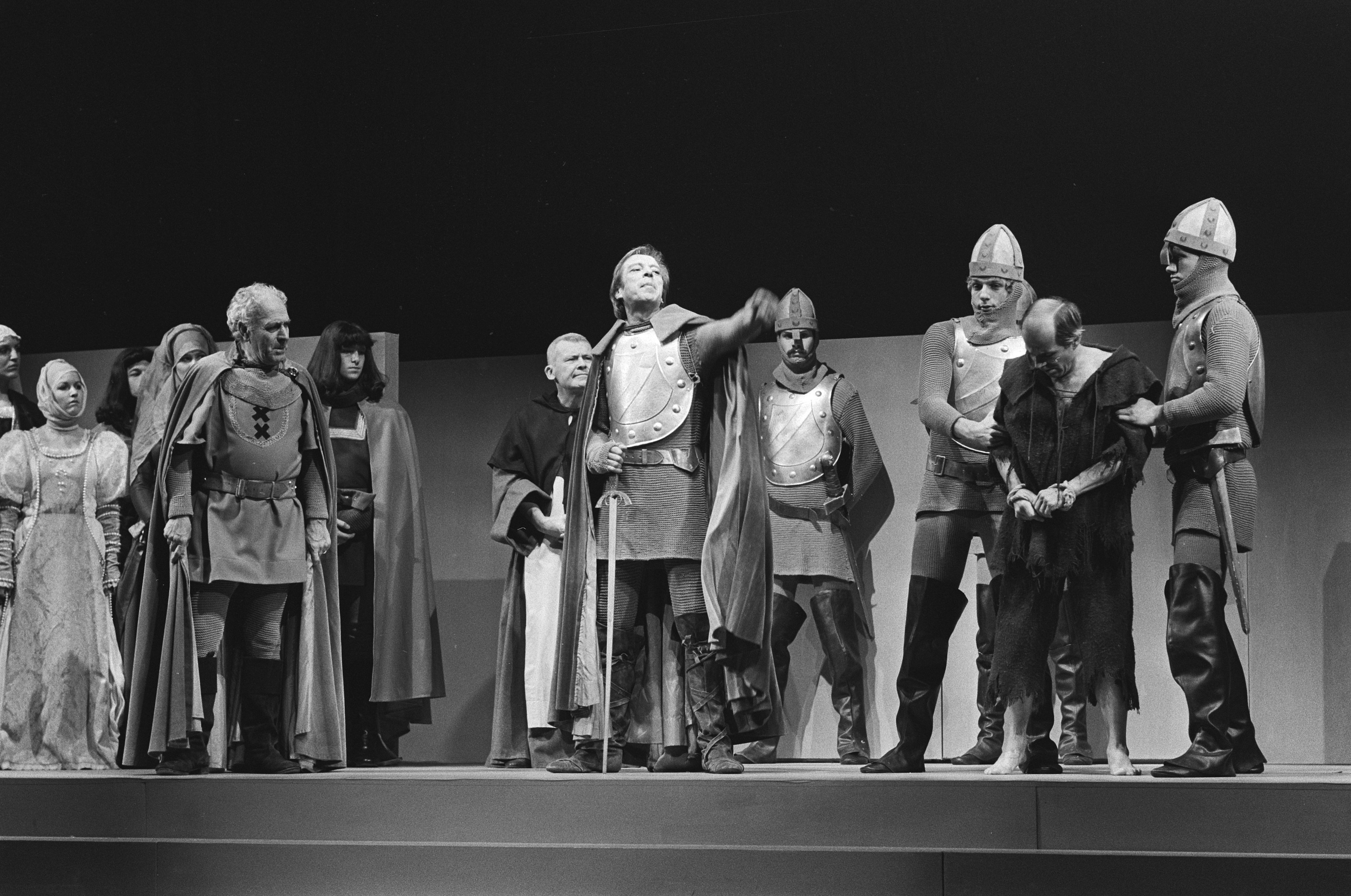
Gijsbrecht (1981)

== Parodies ==
Various parodies and continuations of the play have been produced by other authors, including the musical The Angel of Amsterdam (De Engel van Amsterdam).

== Texts ==
- http://www.dbnl.org/tekst/vond001gysb01/
- http://cf.hum.uva.nl/dsp/ljc/vondel/gysbregt/gysbregt.html
