= Gijsbrecht IV of Amstel =

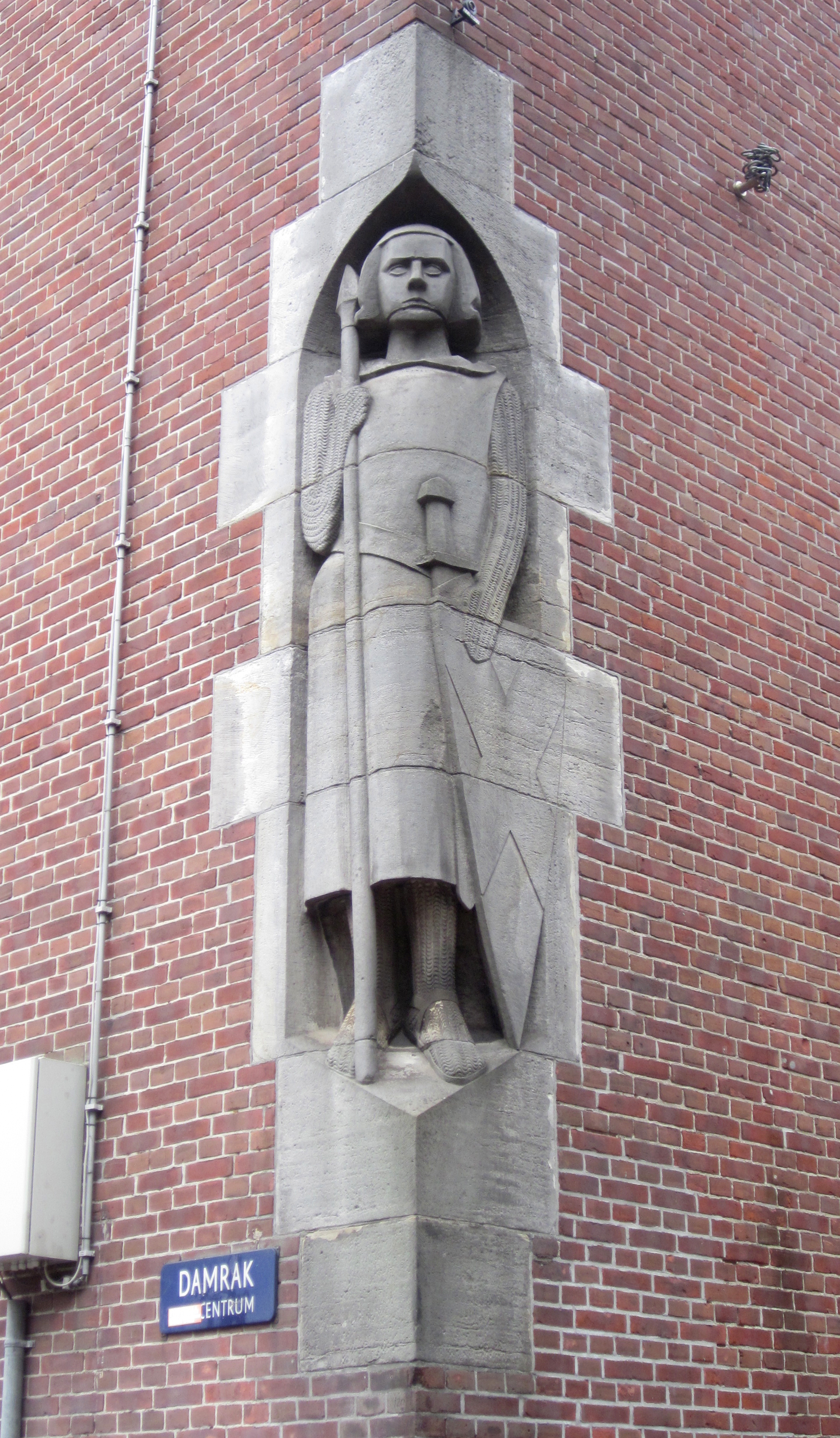
Sculpture of Gijsbrecht IV of Amstel by Lambertus Zijl (Beurs van Berlage)

Gijsbrecht IV of Amstel or Gijsbrecht IV van Amstel (c. 1235 – c. 1303) was a powerful lord in the medieval County of Holland and a member of the Van Aemstel family. His territory was Amstelland, and his son was Jan I of Amstel.

== Life ==
His family probably originated from Ouderkerk aan de Amstel, now in the province of North Holland. They derived their name from their castle on the River Amstel, and tried to create an independent principality between Utrecht and Holland.

To this end Gijsbrecht IV—along with the other powerful lords Zweder of Abcoude, Arnoud of Amstel, and Herman VI of Woerden—instigated a revolt against Floris V, Count of Holland, and John I, Bishop-Elect of Utrecht. They held lands on the border with the adjacent Bishopric of Utrecht—the area of Amsterdam, Abcoude, IJsselstein, and Woerden—at the expense of the bishop, and were backed by the craftsmen of Utrecht, the peasants of Kennemerland—Alkmaar and surroundings—Waterland, Amstelland and the West Frisians. However, when Floris made a treaty with the craftsmen and made concessions to the peasants (Kennemerland was a duneland, where the farmers had far fewer rights than the farmers in the polders), the revolt was brought to an abrupt halt. In 1278, Floris captured Gjisbrecht and exiled Herman. The bishop of Utrecht eventually (in 1279 or 1281) also added the lands of the rebellious lords to Floris's territory in retribution.

Gijsbrecht changed sides when opportune, and some accounts allege him to have been involved in Floris's later capture and assassination. After his resulting exile, he likely settled in Oss in the Duchy of Brabant. He died in exile in Flanders, though Professor Pim de Boer at the University of Groningen has found serious, though not entirely conclusive, indications that Gijsbrecht—after his exile, with a few followers—founded Pruissisch Holland, not far from Elbing.

== Popular culture ==
He was the eponymous hero of a play by Joost van den Vondel, Gijsbrecht van Aemstel. This was set during the siege of 1304, and he switched him with his son Jan. Through this mistaken-identity, Gijsbrecht has become a hero of Amsterdam, with a statue in the Beurs van Berlage and a city park in southern Amsterdam named after him, the Gijsbrecht van Aemstelpark.
