= Herman VI van Woerden =

Herman VI van Woerden (c. 1240 – after 1303) was a lord of Woerden who was involved in a plot to kidnap of Floris V, Count of Holland. In 1296, he collaborated with Gijsbrecht van Amstel and Gerard van Velsen to take Floris prisoner at Muiden Castle. The incident led to the death of Floris, after which Woerden fled to Brabant.

== Biography ==
He was the son of Herman V van Woerden and Badeloch Clemeta van Amstel, daughter of Gijsbrecht III van Amstel.

It is assumed he became ruler of Woerden after 1252, the last year that his father was mentioned. He pledged his loyalty to the bishop of Utrecht as his father had done before him, but he nonetheless desired to expand his territory. In the 1280s, the lands between the County of Holland and the Bishopric of Utrecht were sold to Floris V, Count of Holland. These lands included Woerden, which made Van Woerden a vassal of the Count of Holland. Van Woerden was not happy with this, and several conflicts followed. In 1288, the Count of Holland and Van Woerden reconciled.

Van Woerden took part in the conspiracy to kidnap Floris V, Count of Holland. Together with Gerard van Velzen and Gijsbrecht IV of Amstel he imprisoned the count in the Muiderslot after capturing him by setting up a fake Falconry hunt. After the local population got wind of their count's imprisonment, they rebelled. When Floris attempted to escape, Van Velzen killed him with a dagger. Van Woerden fled and just like Gijsbrecht managed to reach Amstel, from where he went into Exile. He subsequently lost all his titles and lands.

Van Woerden married Elizabeth van Brederode in 1265, a daughter of William, Count of Brederode, and Hildegonda van Voorne. From this marriage he had a daughter named Clementa van Woerden (1265–1316). Van Woerden supposedly married for a second time in 1287, to Elisabeth van Amstel.
