= Vreeland =

- Village
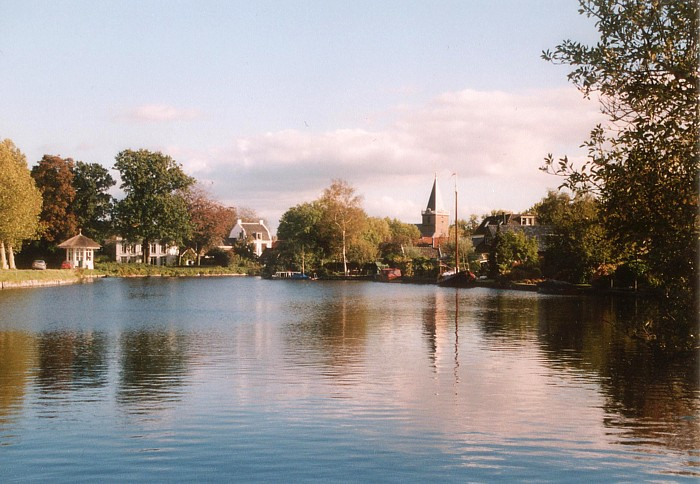
- Vreeland in 2004

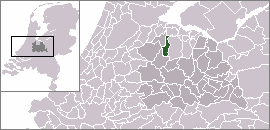

- The village centre (dark green) and the statistical district (light green) of Vreeland in the former municipality of Loenen.
- Coordinates: 52°13′47″N 5°1′52″E
- Country: Netherlands
- Province: Utrecht
- Municipality: Stichtse Vecht

Population (2004)
  - Total: 1,530
- Time zone: UTC+1 (CET)
  - Summer (DST): UTC+2 (CEST)

Vreeland (Dutch pronunciation: [ˈvreːlɑnt]) is a village in the Dutch province of Utrecht. It was a part of the former municipality of Loenen. Since 2011 it has been part of the new formed municipality of Stichtse Vecht. It is located on the river Vecht, about 2 km north of Loenen aan de Vecht. It received city rights in 1265. In 2015, the village celebrates the 750th year of its foundation.

Vreeland is on the provincial road Vinkeveen-Hilversum (N201). Until 1964, Vreeland was a separate municipality.

In 2001, the village of Vreeland had 1339 inhabitants. The built-up area of the village was 0.30 km^{2}, and contained 557 residences. The statistical area "Vreeland", which also can include the peripheral parts of the village, as well as the surrounding countryside, has a population of around 1600.

== Economy ==
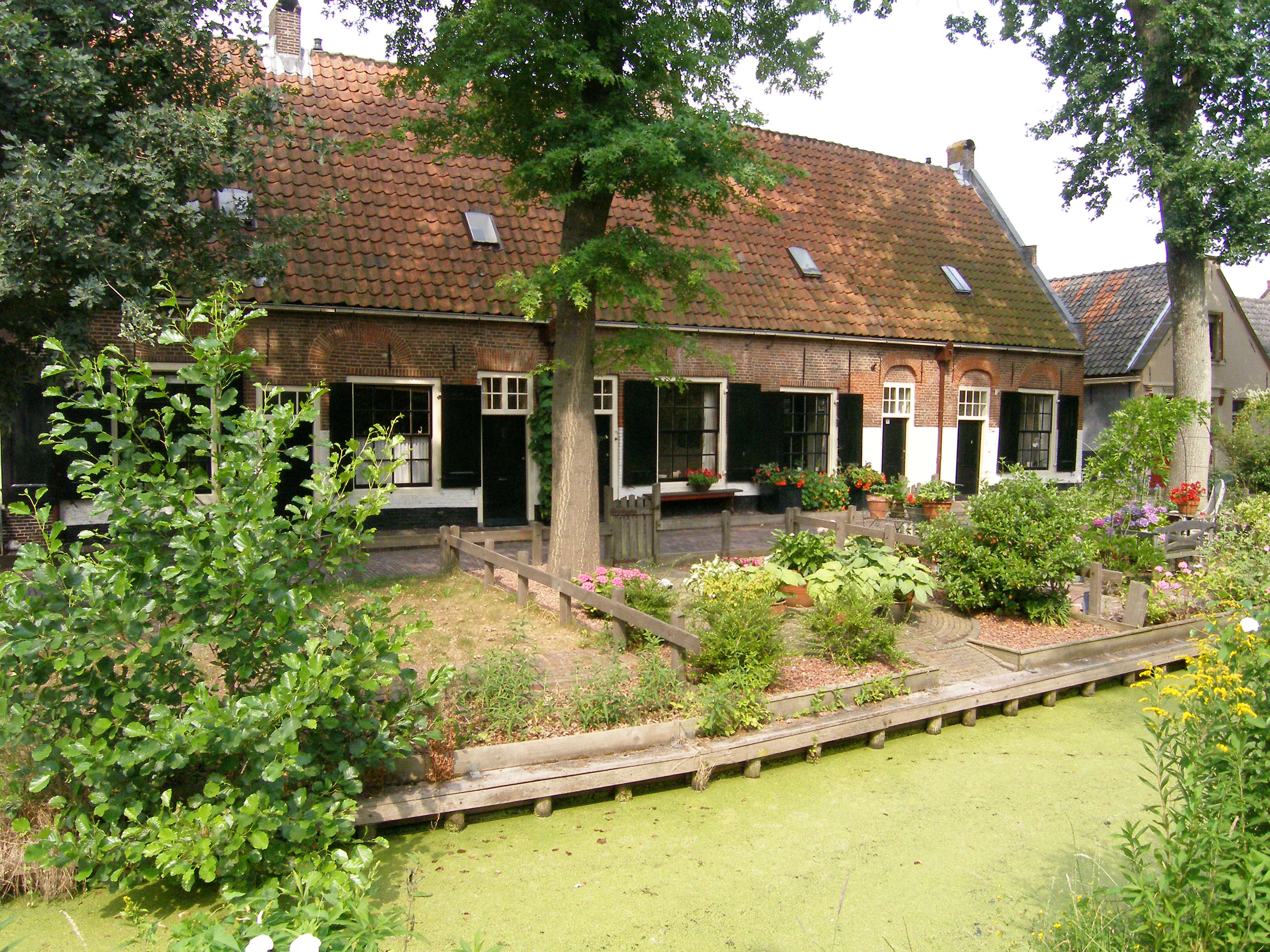
Lindengracht in Vreeland

Vreeland is situated in the Vechtstreek, called after the river Vecht. It is surrounded by several lakes, including the Loosdrecht and Kortenhoef Lakes. River and lakes are used for water recreation. Several bike routes transverse the village, making it a touristic attraction when the weather is fine.

Two important hiking routes traverse the village: the "Floris de Vijfde" path and the "Waterlinie" path; they were opened in September 2004.

In summer there is a buzz from tourists on water as well on land. Almost every season has a festival or party, such as an Autumn Market, a Christmas Market and King's Day (April 27).
