= Van Amstel family =

van Amstel
- family
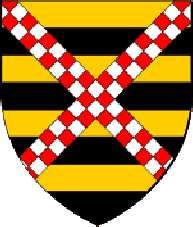
- Country: Netherlands
- Founded: 12th century
- Founder: Wolfgerus van Amstel
- Titles: Lords of Amestelle, knights

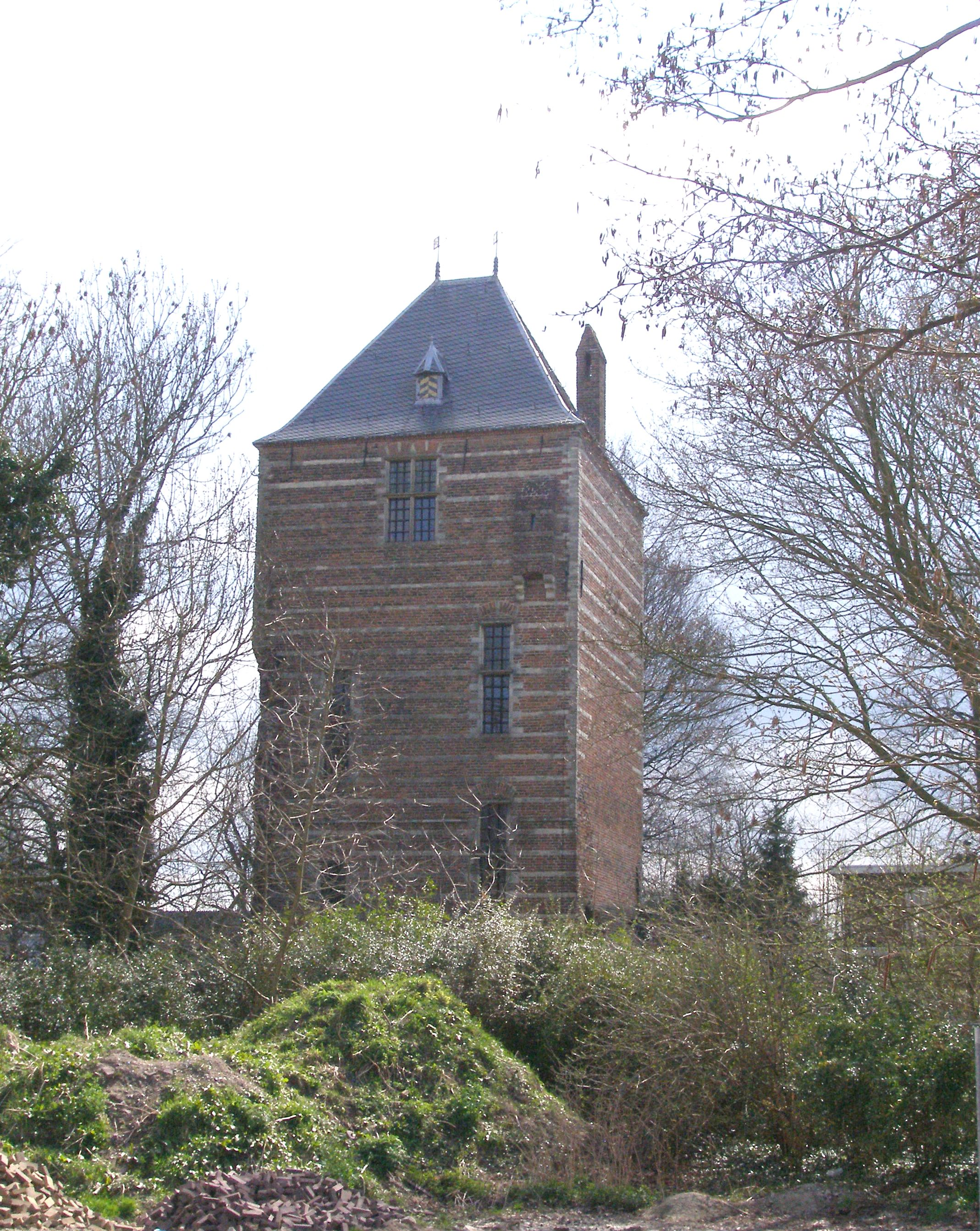
The surviving keep of the Van Amstel castle at IJsselstein.

The van Amstel family (Dutch: Heren van Amstel) was an influential dynasty in the medieval Netherlands from the twelfth until the fourteenth century. The family developed the Amstelland and held the stewardship in the ecclesiastical districts in the northwest of the Nedersticht (largely the current province) of Utrecht, first in the name of the bishop of Utrecht and later the count of Holland.

== History ==
Wolfger van Amstel is named in 1105 as a scultetus (bailiff) of Amestelle (Amstelland). His son Egbert built a small castle or keep (actually more just a fortified manor house) in Ouderkerk aan de Amstel, probably on the spot where the Sefardi cemetery Beth Haim was later sited. In 1204, this building was destroyed by the invading Kennemers. Gijsbrecht II was named the first dominus (lord) of Amestelle in 1226, but came into conflict with the bishop of Utrecht and was led captive into the city of Utrecht behind a horse in 1252. Arnoud of Amstel, a son of Gijsbrecht III, built the castle at IJsselstein in c.1279. His son, Gijsbert van IJsselstein, then founded the city of IJsselstein and the St. Nicolaaskerk church, where he is buried in an ornate tomb. Gijsbrecht IV (1235-1303) became a vassal of Count Floris V of Holland. Gijsbrecht subsequently became one of the most powerful men of Holland and as such also strived for more independence.

When Floris V in January 1296 thought he could realize his expansionism at the expense of Flanders with the support of the French king, Philip IV, he made a fatal mistake. The English king, Edward I, against whose Flemish interests Floris V had entered, ordered Gijsbrecht's cousin, Jan I van Cuijk, to take the count of Holland into hostage and transfer him to England. Van Cuijk organized the abduction, which failed at Muiden and Floris V was killed. As a result of his participation in the coup against Floris V, Gijsbrecht IV van Amstel was banned while his goods were forfeited. He found refuge in 's-Hertogenbosch, the northern border town of the Duchy of Brabant, where he enjoyed ducal protection and received material support from his influential nephew Jan I van Cuijk.

Dutch professor Pim de Boer has found indications - though no conclusive proof - that Gijsbrecht was later involved in the foundation of Prussian Holland. Gijsbrecht III's son Jan I (1270-1345) succeeded in occupying Amsterdam for a while in 1304, but the city was besieged and Jan finally had to flee from the city. Amsterdam temporarily lost its newly acquired town privileges and had to make massive reparations to the count of Holland.

In 1994, the foundations of a castle were discovered in Amsterdam, possibly built by this family, though historians differ on this.

== Family tree ==
- Wolfgerus van Amstel (1075-1131) Bailiff of Amestelle
  - Egbert van Amstel (1105-1172) Bailiff and steward of Amestelle
    - Gijsbrecht I van Amstel (1145-1189) Bailiff and steward of Amestelle
      - Gijsbrecht II van Amstel (1175-1230) Lord of Amestelle, knight
        - Gijsbrecht III van Amstel (1200-1252) Lord of Amestelle, knight
          - Gijsbrecht IV van Amstel (1230-1303) Lord of Amestelle, knight
            - Jan I van Amstel (1270-1345) Knight

== Heraldry ==
The Amstel coat of arms is depicted in the medieval Gelre Armorial (folio 107v.) The description of the coat of arms: barry of gold and sable (black), in eight pieces, over which a motley St. Andrew's cross of silver and gules (red) in two rows.

== Trivia ==
Dutch writer and playwright Joost van den Vondel based his play Gijsbrecht van Aemstel on the history of Gijsbrecht IV of Amstel and his son Jan I of Amstel. Gijsbrecht has a bust on the facade of the Beurs van Berlage in Amsterdam, and also has a park in the city named after him. Cafes in Amsterdam, Breskens, Arnhem, and Mallorca have been named Heren van Amstel after the dynasty.
