= Amstelland =

Region in the Netherlands

Coordinates: 52.27698°N 4.86729°E

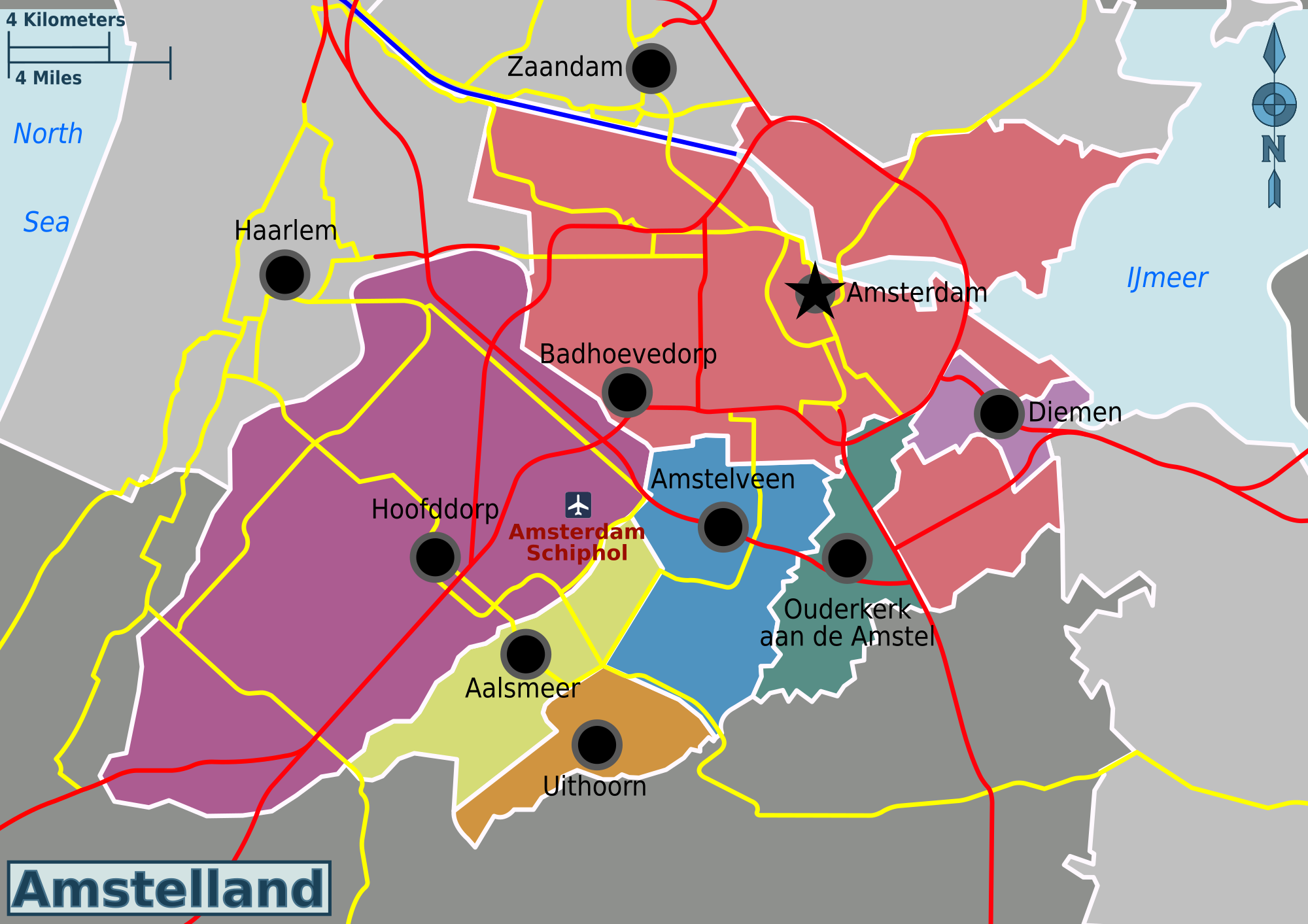
Map of Amstelland

Amstelland is the area along the river Amstel in the Netherlands, beginning in South Holland and running north towards Amsterdam in southern North Holland.

== History ==
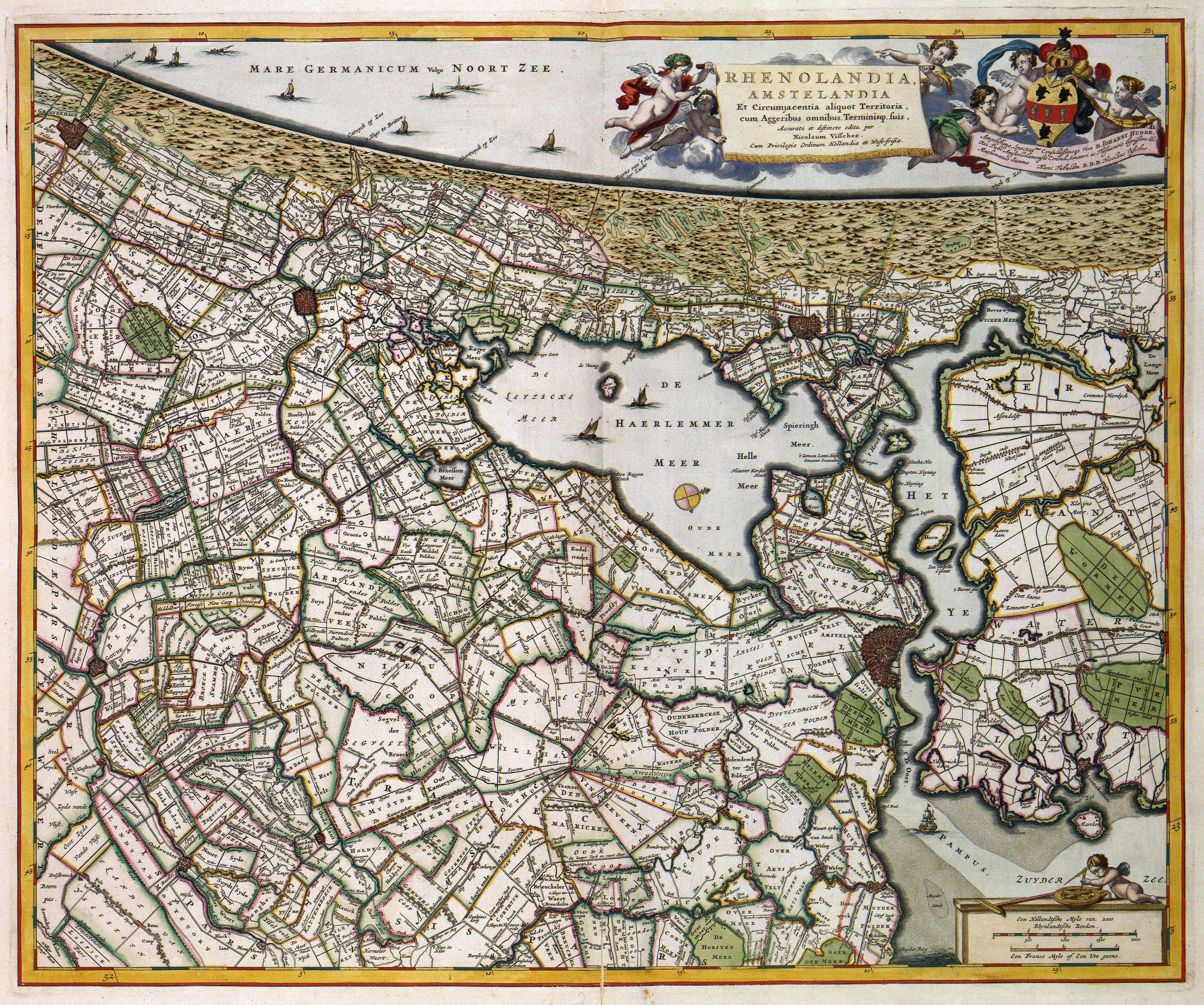
1681 map of "Rhenolandia, Amstelandia". Amstelland is roughly the area on the lower centre part of the map.

Amstelland's history is inextricably linked with the Amstel river and the growth of Amsterdam. Its history is essentially the history of Amstelveen, Aalsmeer, Ouderkerk aan de Amstel and the other towns. The river was important in medieval times as a waterway leading to the south and to Utrecht. The oldest settlement in the area was Ouderkerk aan de Amstel, which dated from the 11th century (and thus is older than Amsterdam). Amsterdam at this time was a small fishing village at the mouth of the Amstel. A part of Utrecht, this area was part of the seigniory (heerlijkheid) of the Van Aemstel family.

At one point the right bank of the Amstel was being referred to as the "Old Amstel" (Ouder-Amstel), the left bank as the "New Amstel" (Nieuwer-Amstel). Peat was an important source of fuel at the time. The fens around the river were dredged for their peat. By the 13th century there was a small community of peat workers in the fens west of the Amstel—the "Amstel fen" (Amstelveen) in Nieuwer-Amstel. Meanwhile, when a dam was constructed at the mouth of the Amstel, the now strategically located fishing hamlet in the north of Nieuwer-Amstel grew quickly. The settlement on the Amstel dam became "Amstellerdam" (or something similar), which became "Amsterdam". Amsterdam acquired city rights around 1300 and quickly dominated the entire region.

After the Napoleonic occupation of the Netherlands, the French created new administrative divisions in the Netherlands and named them (as they did in France) after major rivers. From 1807 to 1810, there was a département called "Amstelland". The landdrost (préfet) was Jan van Styrum. On 1 January 1811 Amstelland was integrated into a new département called Zuyderzee (Zuyderzée), with van Styrum remaining in office until 11 February 1811. "Amstelland" was no longer used as the name.

In 1896 and 1921 Amsterdam annexed parts of Nieuwer Amstel and built suburbs (Rivierenbuurt) along the Amstel. Today Amsterdam and Amstelveen have grown extensively, including large parts of land on both sides of the river. However, much of Amstelland has remained undeveloped and has retained its green, rural character.

== Geography ==
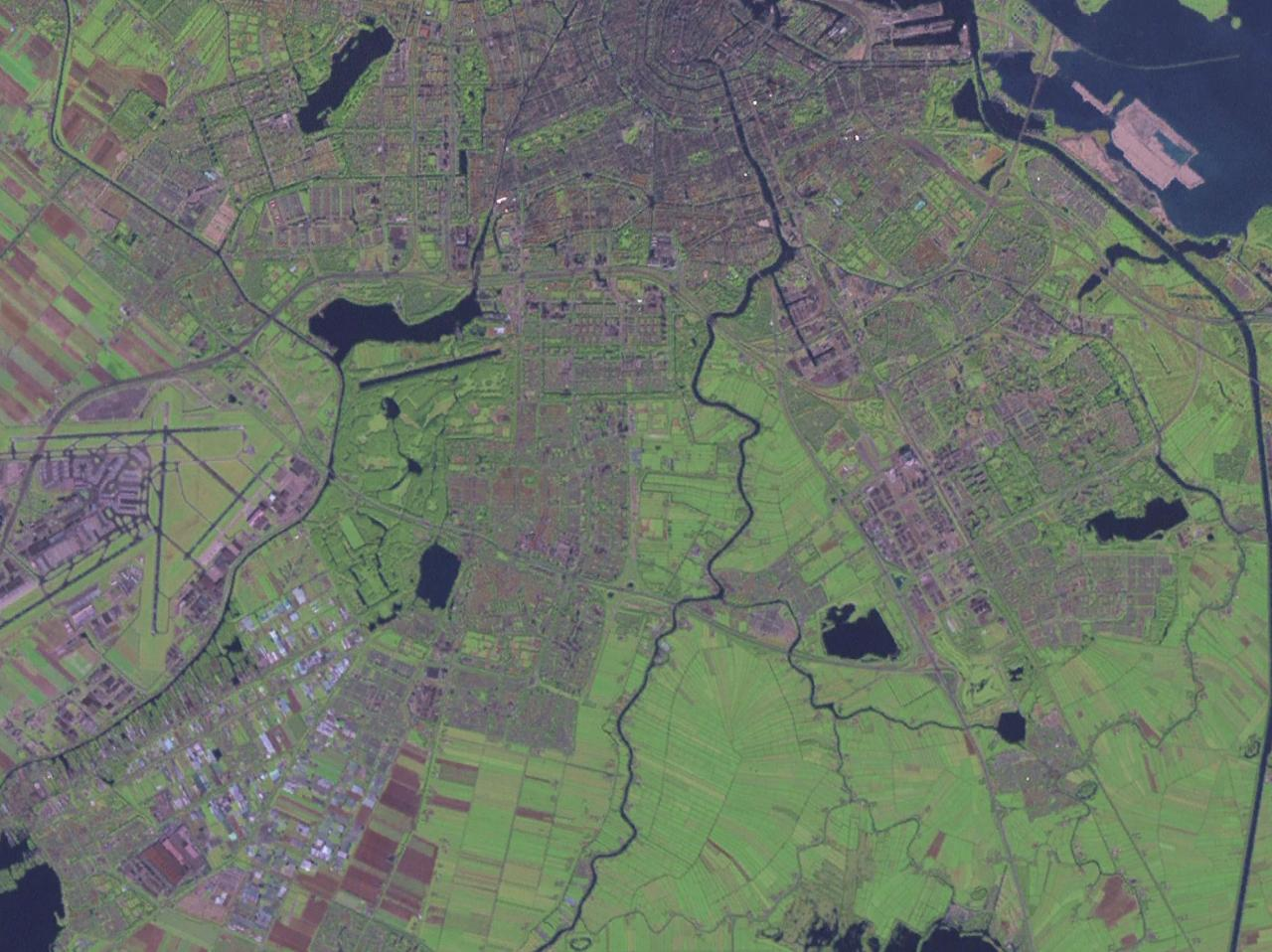
Aerial view of northern part of Amstelland, including the wedge-shaped green area jutting into Amsterdam

The term Amstelland nowadays generally refers to the area along the river Amstel just south of the city of Amsterdam. The borders of Amstelland are not, however, precisely defined and the meaning of Amstelland can depend on the context.

=== Amstelland as green space ===
Amstelland includes the green wedge-shaped area that juts into Amsterdam from the south. Extending south of the Utrechtsebrug, this green area has a rural character and remains free of development. It is managed by an organisation called Groengebied Amstelland ("Amstelland Green Area").

When used in this sense, Amstelland means just the triangle of green space just south of Amsterdam and does not include the surrounding built-up areas and villages. It is seen as an area worth protecting because of the green and rural elements it brings almost into the heart of Amsterdam. Not every city can boast that there is pasture land just a 15-minute cycle away. A project called Toekomst Amstelland ("Future Amstelland") has been set up to help protect this area and guide its future. They define the borders of Amstelland as follows: "The area between the A9, Amstelveen, Ouderkerk aan de Amstel, Uithoorn, De Ronde Venen, Abcoude and Amsterdam-Zuidoost."

=== Amstelland as a wider area ===
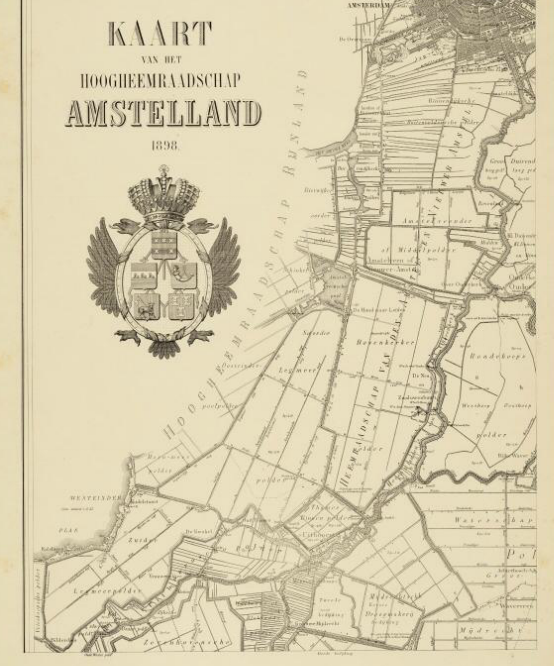
1898 map of Amstelland

Today, Amsterdam is not generally considered to be part of Amstelland, even though the river Amstel does run through the city and historically Amsterdam was part of Amstelland. Generally, the towns and villages that can, without dispute, be said to be part of Amstelland are:

- Amstelveen
- Ouder-Amstel
- Ouderkerk aan de Amstel
- Nes aan de Amstel
- Uithoorn

Amstelhoek, a village that is part of the municipality of De Ronde Venen, lies on the Amstel in the province of Utrecht, south of Uithoorn. It is sometimes considered to be part of Amstelland.

Amstelland has also been used in these contexts:

- Amstelland is not a formal administrative region per se, but there are several bodies that refer to Amstelland as a district. For example, Amsterdam-Amstelland is a large region within the police department and fire department. When used in this sense, "Amstelland" includes various towns south of Amsterdam.
- Sometimes, Amstelland is used in a wider sense to refer to a large area to the south of Amsterdam. It can also be used in the sense of "the greater Amsterdam area", including Amsterdam itself.
- In a historical context, Amstelland was the "land around the Amstel" and Amsterdam was merely a town in Amstelland.
- From 1807 to 1811, Amstelland was the name given to what is today North Holland.

== Gallery ==
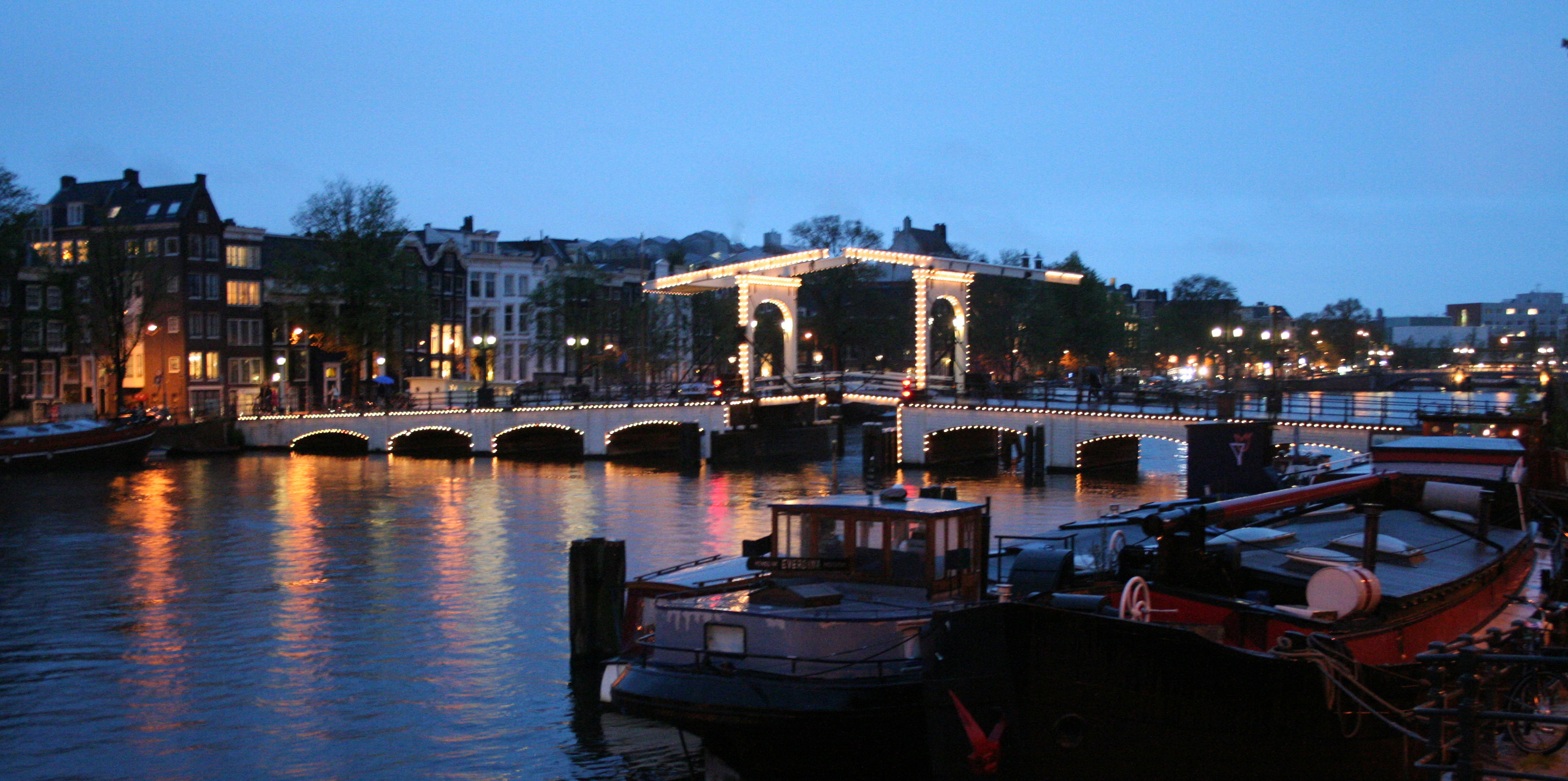
The Magere Brug in Amsterdam

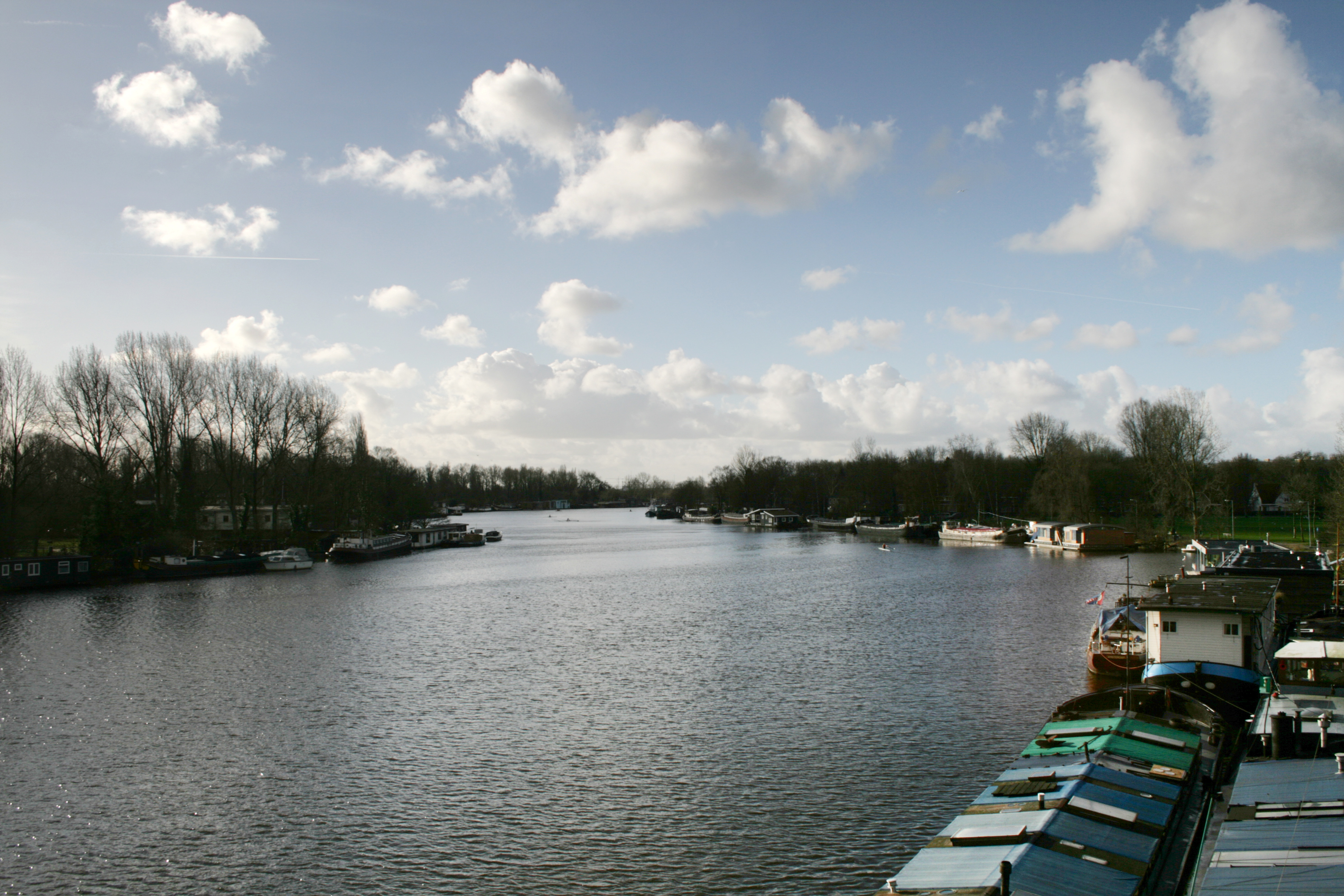
The Amstel and Amstelland as seen from the Utrechtsbrug just south of Amsterdam

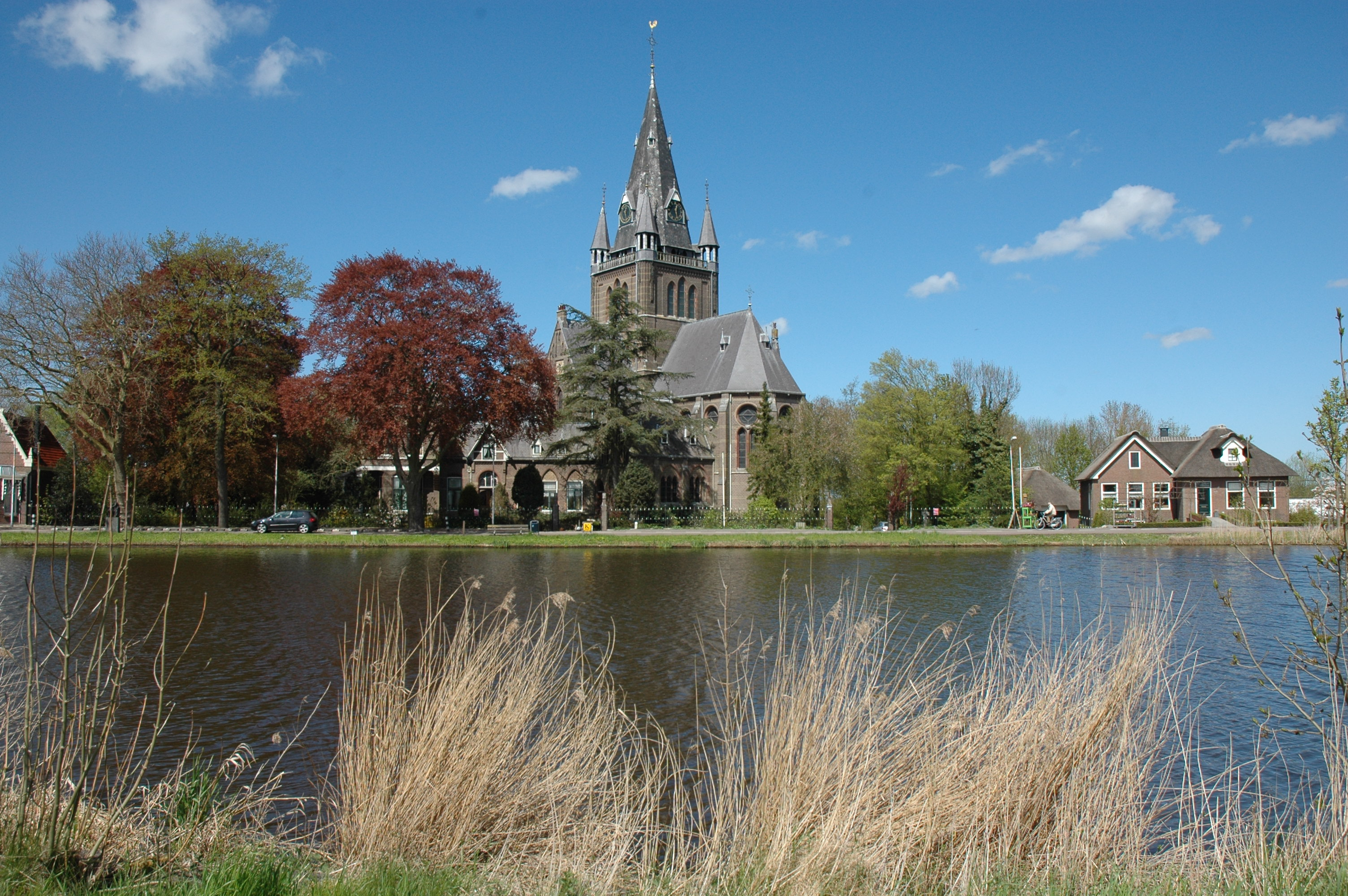
Nes aan de Amstel

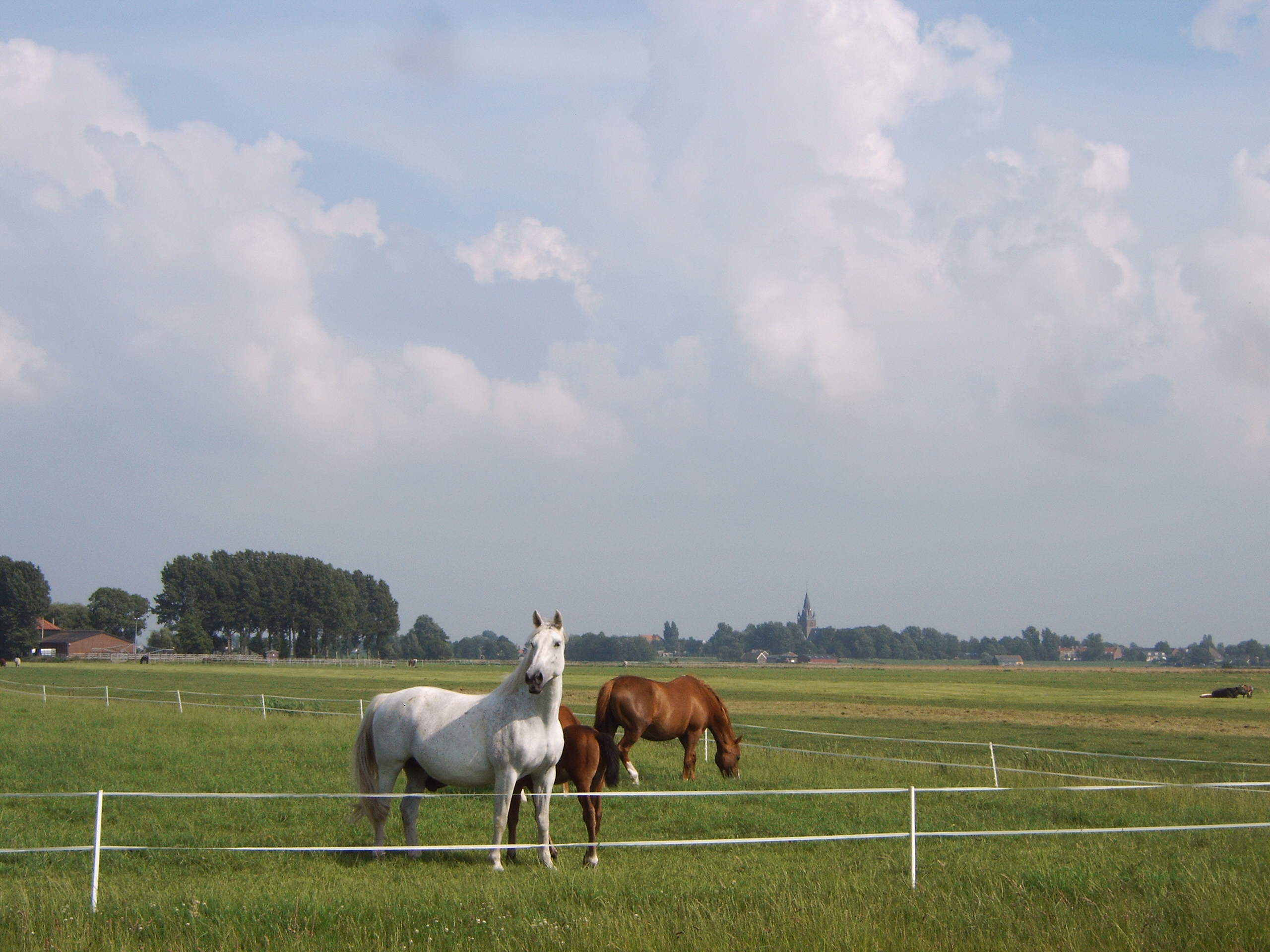
Amstelland countryside near Nes aan de Amstel

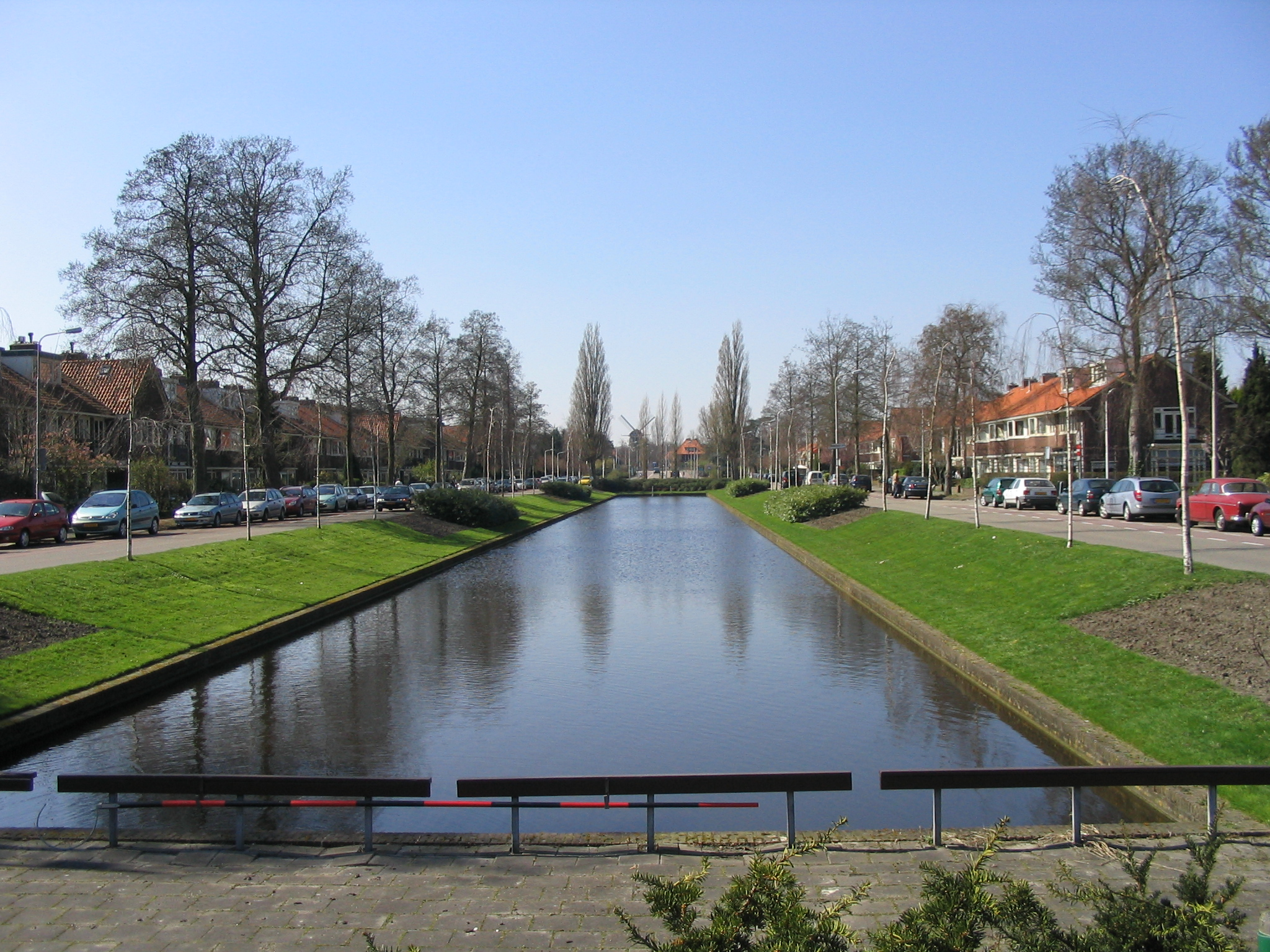
Street scene in Amstelveen

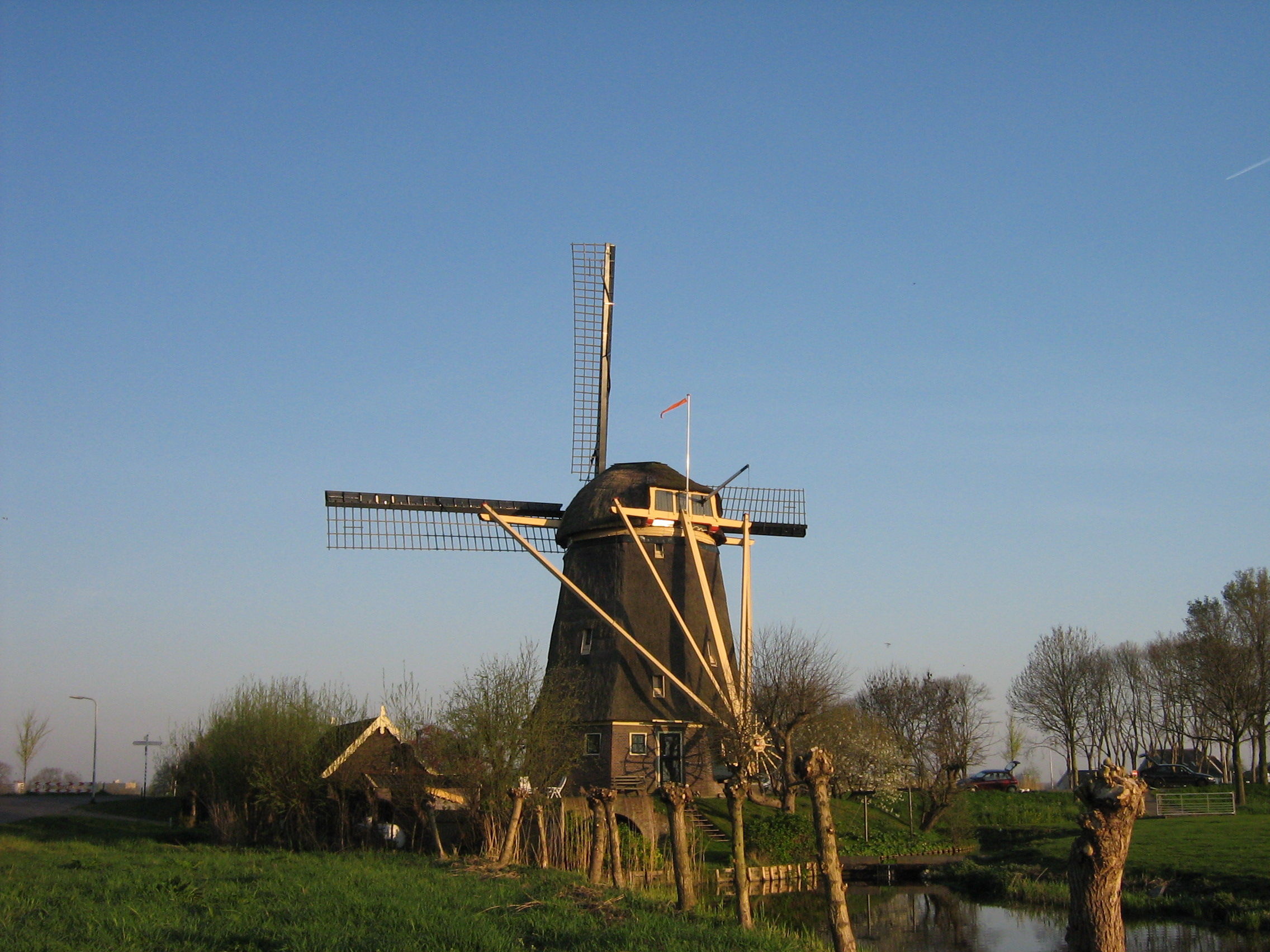
De Zwaan windmill, near Ouderkerk aan de Amstel

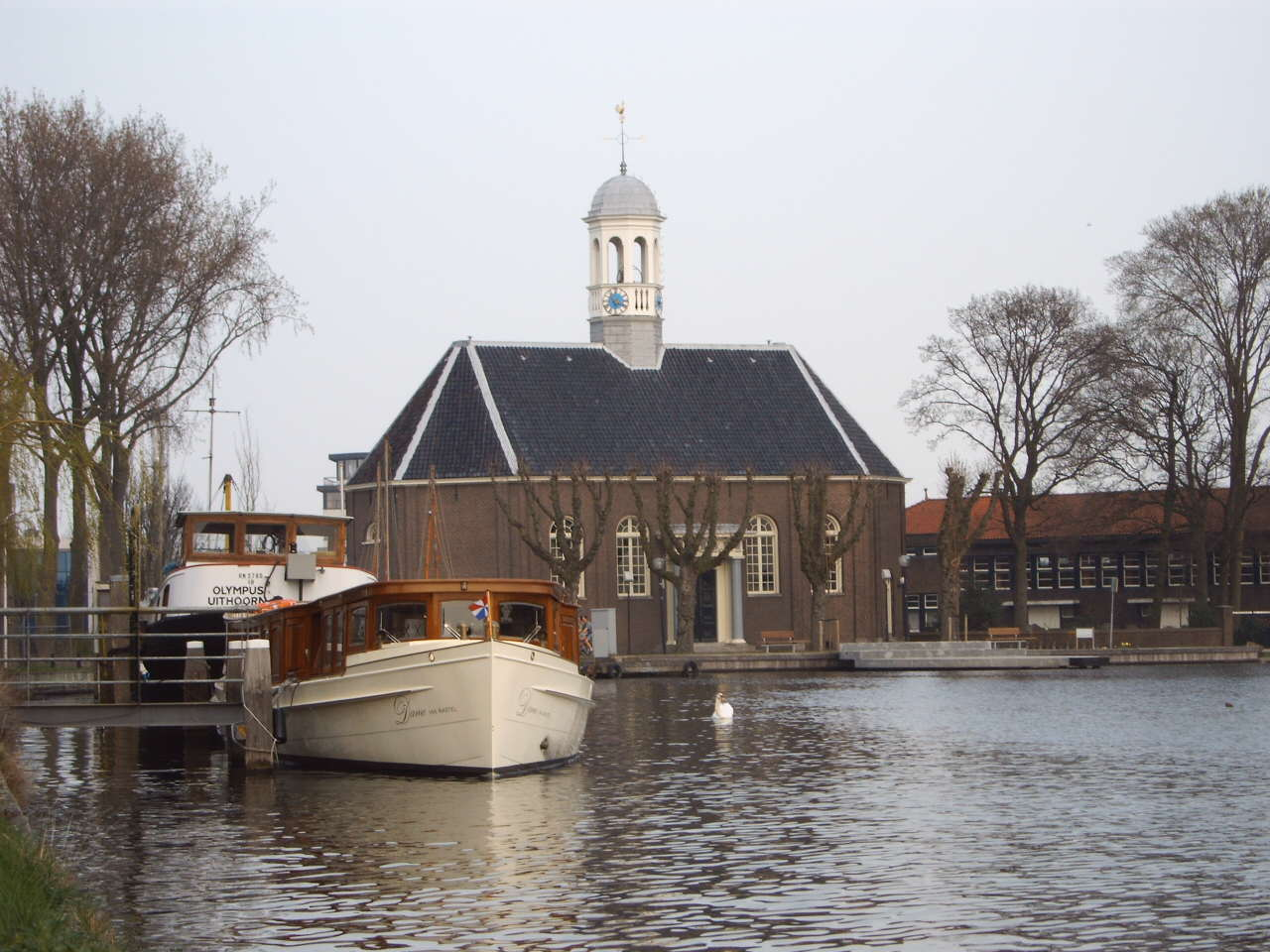
Thamerkerk in Uithoorn

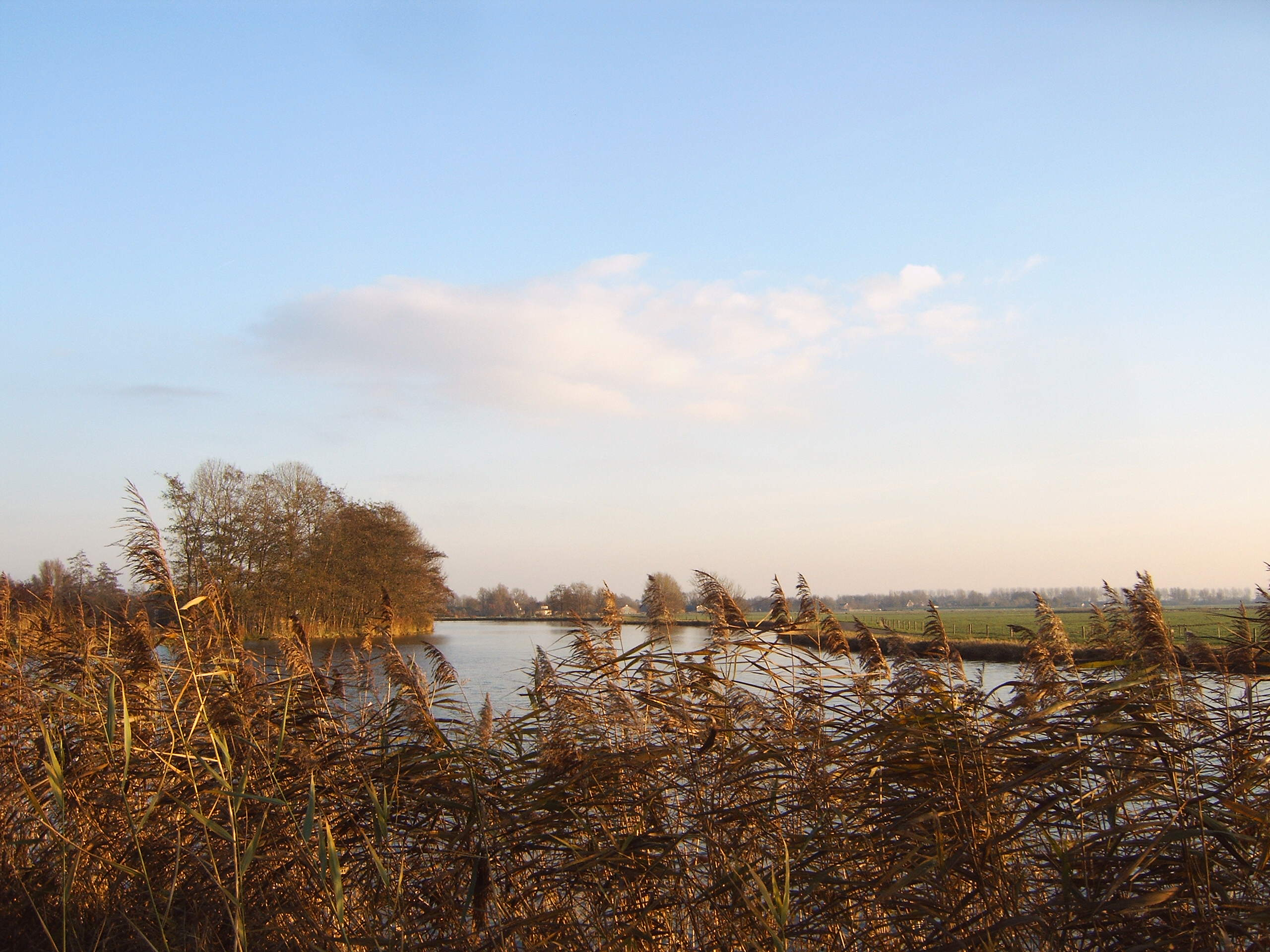
River Amstel south of Uithoorn

== See also ==
- Amstelland. Land van water en veen. Auteurs: Adriaan Haartsen en Nikki Brand. Uitgeverij Matrijs, 2005. ISBN 90-5345-260-5
