= Gooise Meren =

- Municipality
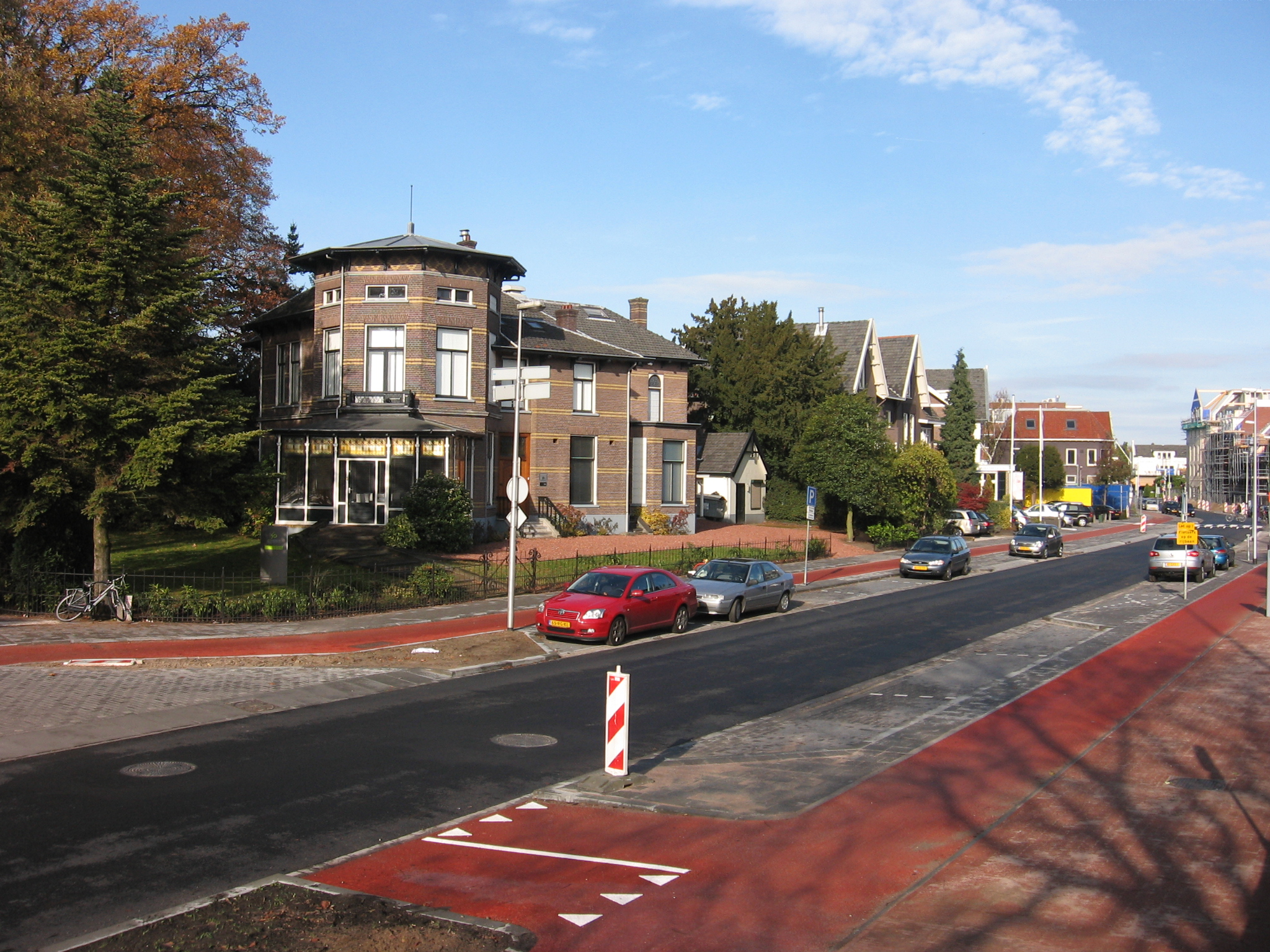
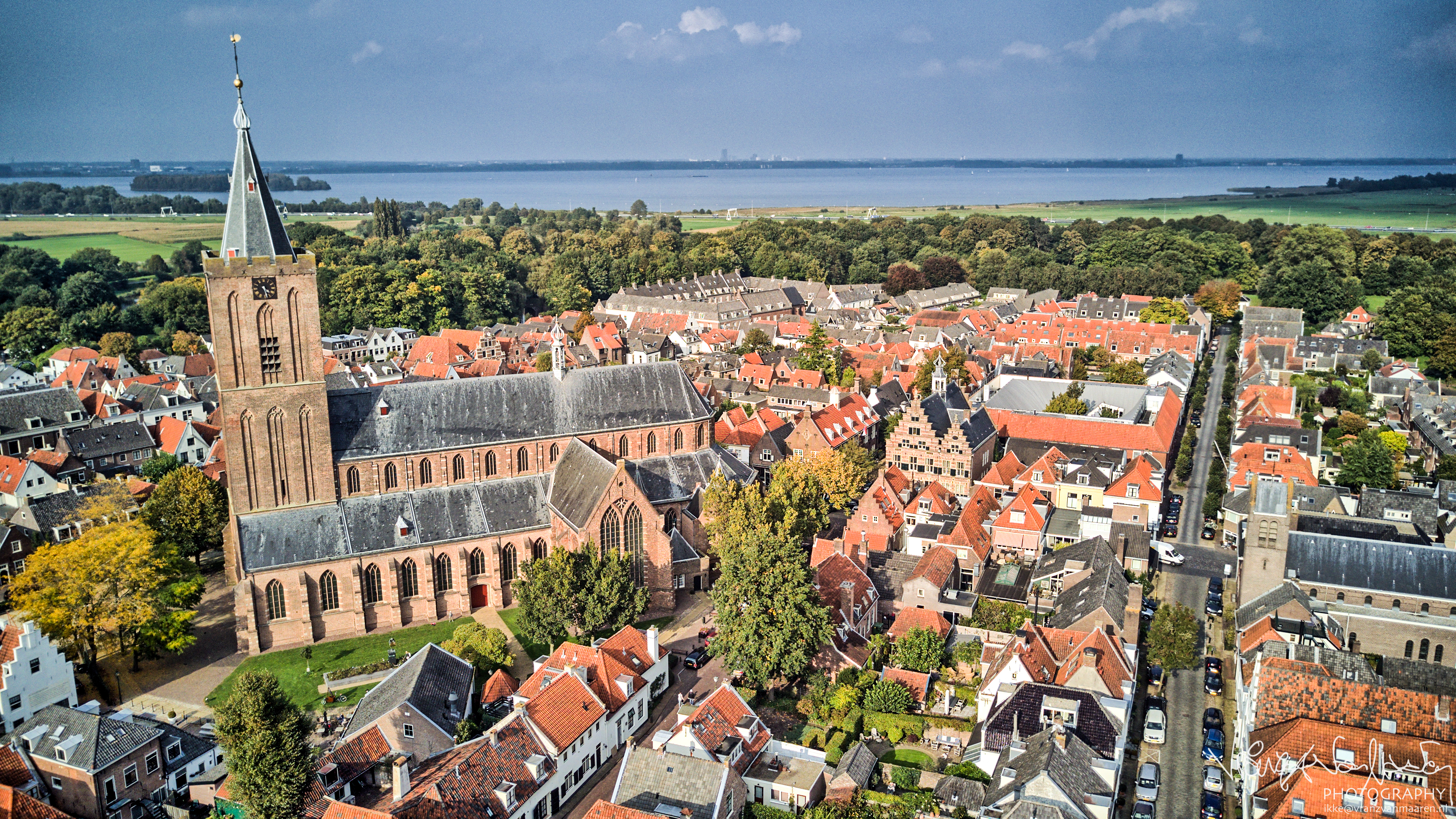
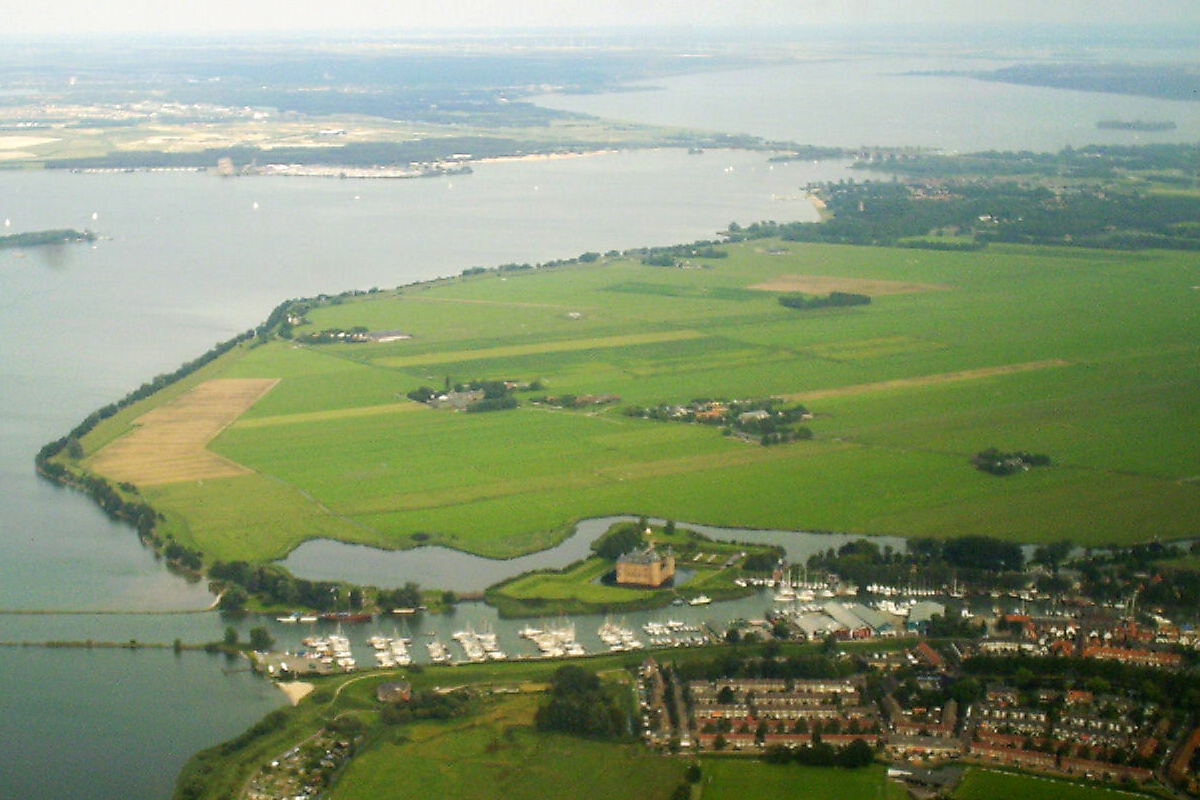
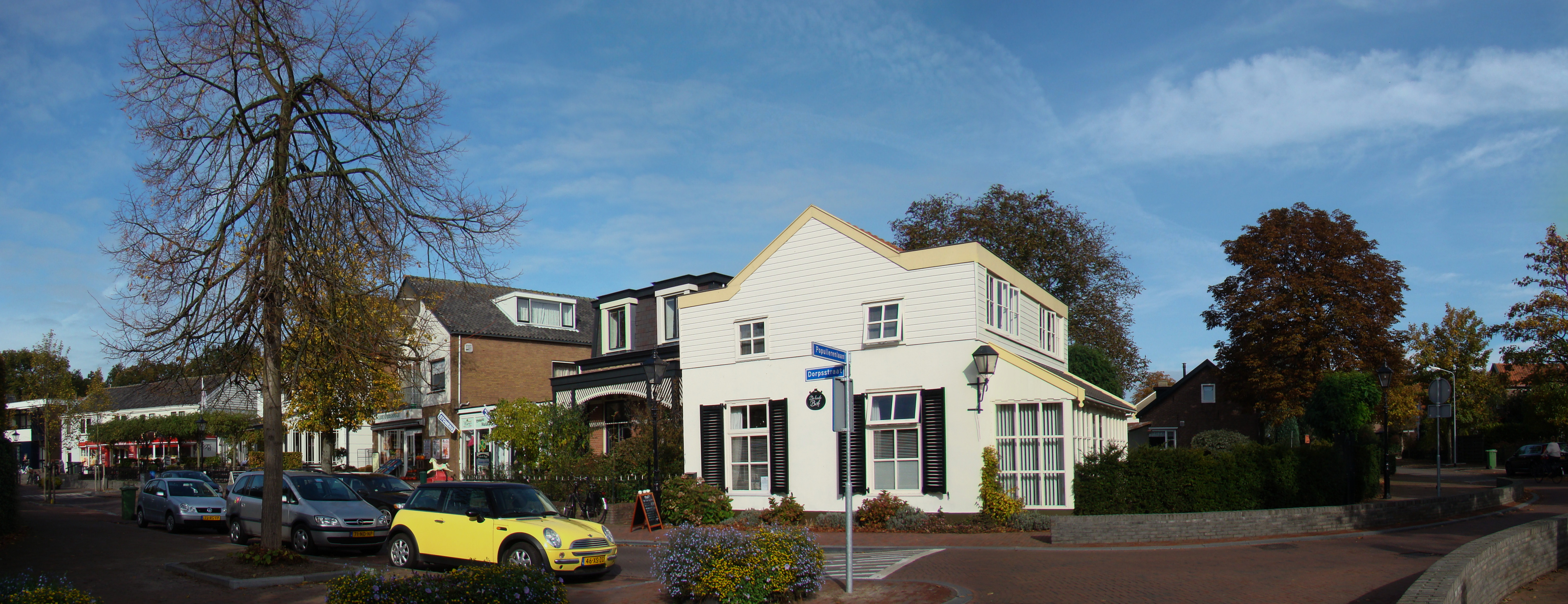
- Bussum across from city hall Aerial view of the historic city of Naarden Aerial view of Muiden and Muiden Castle Dorpsstraat in Muiderberg

- Flag Coat of arms

- Location in North Holland
- Coordinates: 52.2833°N 5.1667°E
- Country: Netherlands
- Province: North Holland
- Region: Amsterdam metropolitan area
- Established: 1 January 2016

Government
  - Body: Municipal council
  - Mayor: Han ter Heegde (VVD)

Area
  - Total: 75.22 km^{2} (29.04 sq mi)
  - Land: 41.59 km^{2} (16.06 sq mi)
  - Water: 33.63 km^{2} (12.98 sq mi)

Population (January 2021)
  - Total: 58,524
  - Density: 1,407/km^{2} (3,640/sq mi)
- Time zone: UTC+1 (CET)
  - Summer (DST): UTC+2 (CEST)
- Postcode: 1398–1406, 1410–1414
- Area code: 0294, 035
- Website: gooisemeren.nl

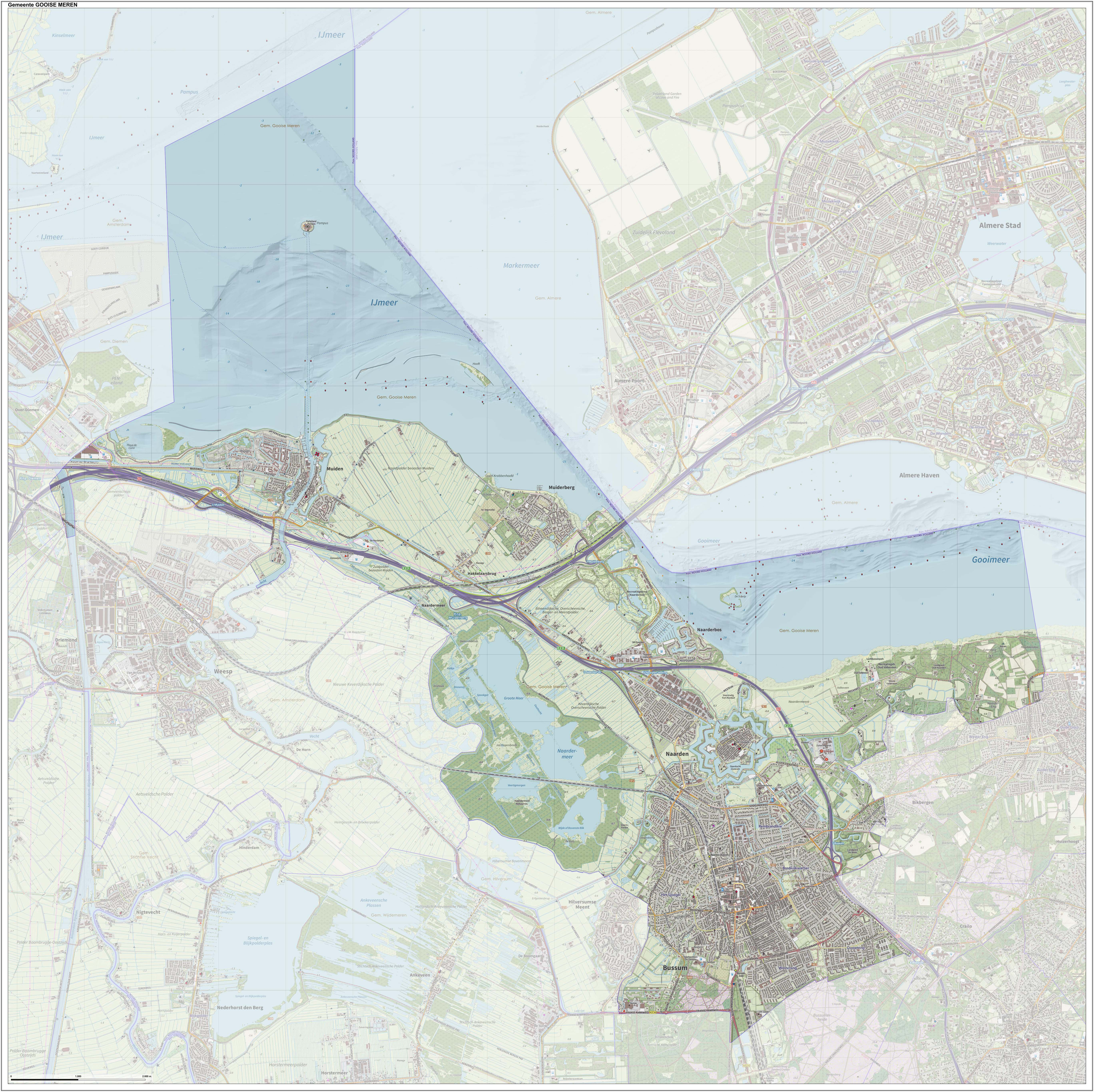
Map of the municipality of Gooise Meren

Gooise Meren (pronounced [ˈɣoːisə ˈmeːrə(n)]) is a municipality in the province of North Holland, the Netherlands. It has about 58,000 inhabitants and covers an area of about 77 km^{2} (30 sq mi).

Gooise Meren has existed since 2016. It is a merger of the three former municipalities of Bussum, Muiden (including Muiderberg) and Naarden. Eastern (Naarden area) and southern part (Bussum area) of the municipality lie within the Gooi region, western part (Muiden area) lies within the Vechtstreek region.

The very northern part of the Utrecht Hill Ridge, lake Naardermeer and artificial island Pampus are situated within its boundaries.

Gooise Meren borders in the northwest on lake IJmeer, in the northeast on lake Gooimeer. The Vecht river empties into the IJmeer at Muiden, and also the northern end of the former Hollandic Water Line ends in Muiden.

== Politics ==
The municipal council consists of 33 members which, after the 2026 municipal elections, were divided as follows:

- D66 - 8 seats
- VVD - 7 seats
- Goois Democratic Platform - 6 seats
- GroenLinks / PvdA - 5 seats
- Hart voor Gooise Meren - 4 seats
- CDA - 2 seats
- Partij voor Leefomgeving En Klimaat - 1 seat

The municipal executive consists of a mayor (Han ter Heegde, VVD) and five aldermen (2 VVD, 2 D66, 1 Goois Democratic Platform).

== Notable people ==
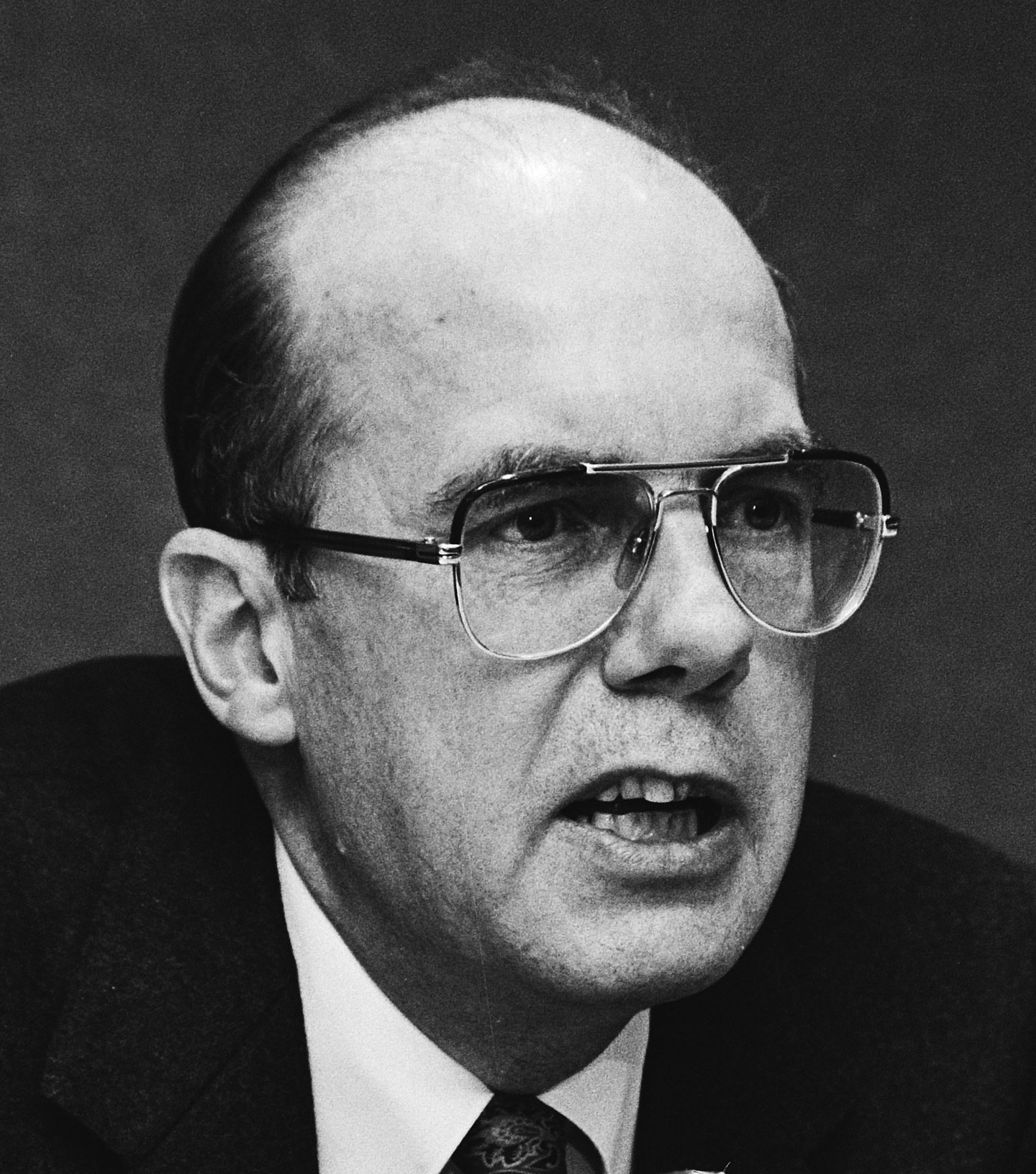
Job de Ruiter, 1980

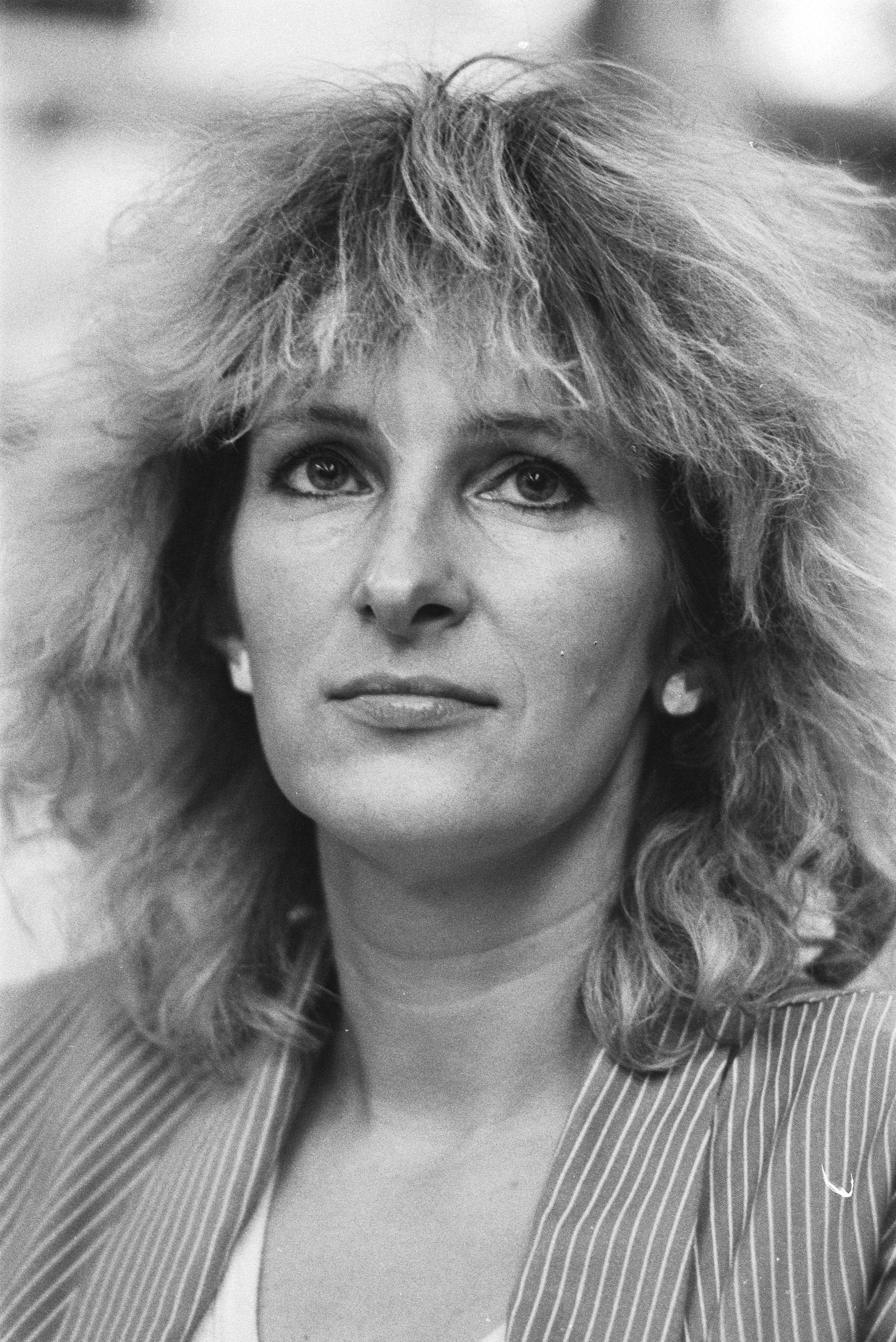
Tessa de Loo, 1983

- Willem Cornelisz van Muyden (1573 in Muiden – 1634) ship's carpenter and mariner
- Salomon van Ruysdael (ca.1602 in Naarden – 1670) Dutch Golden Age landscape painter
- Jan van Neck (1634–1714) Dutch Golden Age painter
- Moses Lemans (1785 in Naarden – 1832) Dutch-Jewish Hebraist and mathematician and a leader of the Haskalah movement in Holland
- Pieter Merkus (1787 in Naarden – 1844) Governor-General of the Dutch East Indies 1841/1844
- Willem Cornelis Bauer (1862 – 1904 in Bussum) architect and painter
- Frederik van Eeden (1860 – 1932 in Bussum) writer and psychiatrist
- Abraham Samson Onderwijzer (1862 in Muiden – 1934) Dutch rabbi
- Frank Martin (1890 – 1974 in Naarden) Swiss composer
- Willem Arondeus (1894 in Naarden – 1943) artist and author who joined the Dutch resistance
- Gerrit Jan van Heuven Goedhart (1901 in Bussum – 1956) politician and diplomat, first United Nations High Commissioner for Refugees 1951/1956
- Freddy Wittop (1911 in Bussum – 2001) costume designer, dancer and college professor
- Wim van Norden (1917 in Bussum – 2015) journalist, co-founder of Het Parool
- Paul Biegel (1925 in Bussum – 2006) prolific writer of children's literature
- Willem Duys (1928 in Bussum – 2011) radio and TV presenter, tennis player and music producer, lived in Naarden
- Virginie Korte-van Hemel (1929 in Bussum – 2014) politician and jurist
- Job de Ruiter (1930 – 2015 in Naarden) politician, diplomat and jurist
- Ronnie Tober (born 1945 in Bussum) singer
- Tessa de Loo (born 1946 in Bussum) pen name of the Dutch novelist and short story writer
- Marjan Unger (1946 in Bussum – 2018) Dutch art historian, wrote the standard work on Dutch jewellery
- André Knevel (born 1950 in Bussum) Canadian concert organist, arranger and accompanist
- René Bernards (born 1953 in Bussum) cancer researcher and academic
- Ernst Reijseger (born 1954 in Bussum) cellist and composer, with jazz and contemporary classical music
- Youp van 't Hek (born 1954 in Naarden) comedian, author and singer-songwriter
- Arthur Arnold (born 1967 in Naarden) an orchestra conductor.
- Thekla Reuten (born 1975 in Bussum) actress
- Josylvio (born 1992 in Naarden) hip hop rapper
- Egbert Haverkamp-Begemann (1923 in Naarden – 2017), Dutch American art historian

=== Sport ===
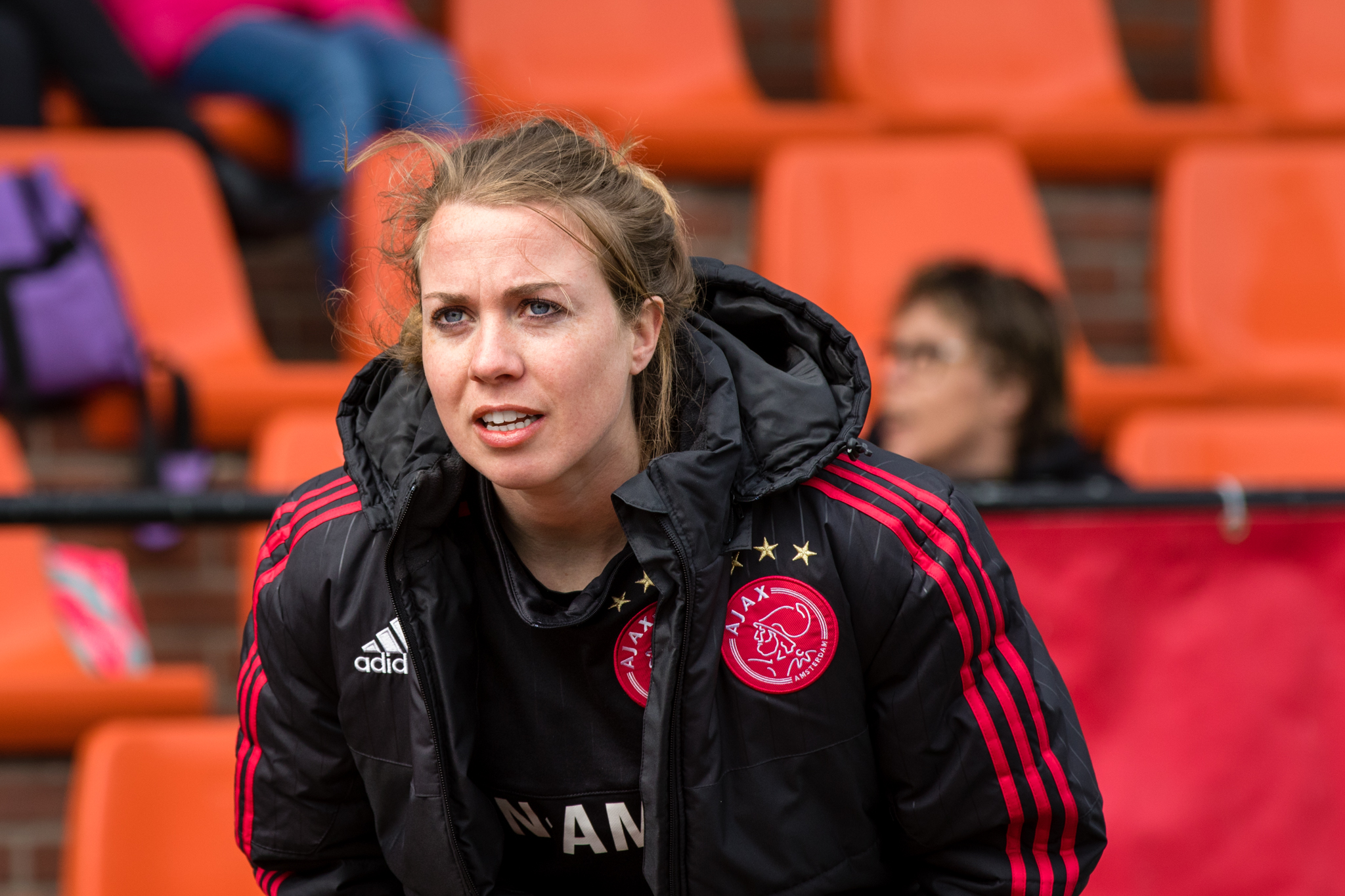
Marlous Pieëte, 2016

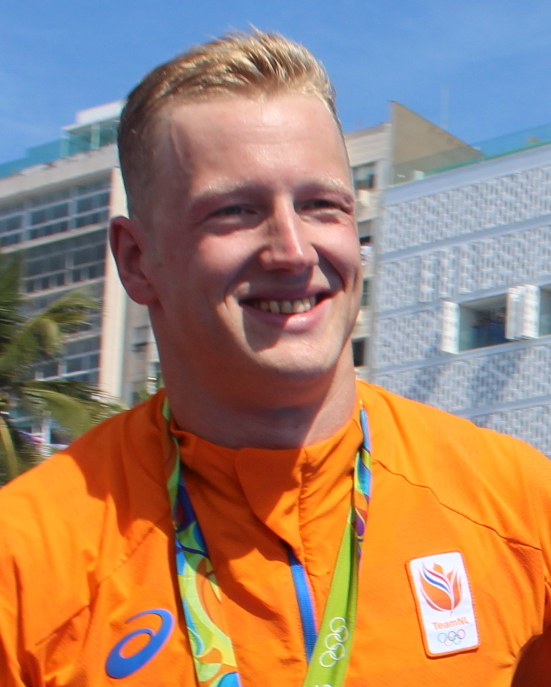
Ferry Weertman, 2016

- Tineke Lagerberg (born 1941 in Bussum) retired Dutch swimmer, team bronze medallist at the 1960 Summer Olympics
- Huub Rothengatter (born 1954 in Bussum) former racing driver
- Anneloes Nieuwenhuizen (born 1963 in Bussum) former Dutch field hockey defender, team gold medallist at the 1984 Summer Olympics
- Ruud Hesp (born 1965 in Bussum) Dutch former professional football goalkeeper with 504 club caps
- twins Tim & Tom Coronel (born 1972 in Naarden) Dutch racing drivers
- Wouter Jolie (born 1985 in Naarden) Dutch field hockey player, team silver medallist at the 2012 Summer Olympics
- Lucas Steijn (born 1986 in Muiderberg) Dutch former basketball player
- Marlous Pieëte (born 1989 in Naarden) Dutch female retired international footballer with 51 caps for the NL
- Ferry Weertman (born 1992 in Naarden) Dutch long-distance freestyle swimmer, gold medalist at the 2016 Summer Olympics
- Robin van Kampen (born 1994) Dutch chess grandmaster, brought up in Bussum
- Youri Mulder (born in 1969) retired Dutch Footballer
- Joël Drommel (born 1996), football goalkeeper
