= Braat =

Braat is a Dutch language surname. People with the name include:

- Arend Braat (1874-1947), Dutch politician
- Floris Braat (born 1979), Dutch canoeist
- Joseph Braat (born 1946), Dutch optical engineer
- Marloes Braat (born 1990), Dutch cricketer
- Sebastiaan Braat (born 1992), Dutch cricketer
