= Marleen de Pater-van der Meer =

Dutch politician

Interim mayor of Muiden
- In office 28 September 2010 – 13 December 2015

Member of the House of Representatives
- In office 6 February 2001 – 17 June 2010

Alderman of Zutphen
- In office 1 May 1990 – 14 April 1998

Member of the municipal council of Zutphen
- In office 28 April 1980 – 14 April 1998

Personal details
- Born: 19 November 1950 Hekelingen, Netherlands
- Died: 13 December 2015 (aged 65) Zutphen, Netherlands
- Party: Anti-Revolutionary Party (until 1980), Christian Democratic Appeal

Maartje Lena "Marleen" de Pater-van der Meer (19 November 1950 – 13 December 2015) was a Dutch politician, she served as member of the House of Representatives for the Christian Democratic Appeal between 2001 and 2010. Before her time in the House she was active in the municipal politics of Zutphen. After her period as MP she was interim mayor of Muiden until her death.

== Career ==
Van der Meer was born on 19 November 1950 in Hekelingen. She followed her primary and secondary education in Spijkenisse obtaining her diploma in 1966. Afterwards she studied childcare at the vocational university in Zetten between 1967 and 1971.

Van der Meer married in 1972 and took the name of her husband. She was a teacher between 1972 and 1974 and again between 1983 and 1989.

Van der Meer became member of the Anti-Revolutionary Party in 1970. She joined the municipal council of Zutphen for the party in 1980 and served for nearly 18 years. Between 1990 and 1998 she was concurrently alderman, serving six of those years as deputy mayor. From 1999 to 2001 she was interim director of the Stichting "Kerk en Wereld".

In 2001 de Pater-van der Meer was elected to the House of Representatives for the Christian Democratic Appeal. She was member between 6 February 2001 and 17 June 2010. In the House she concerned herself with the fight against human trafficking and with raising the legal age of prostitution. She was invested as a Knight of the Order of Orange-Nassau on occasion of her departure from the House on 16 June 2010.

After her time at the national political level De Pater-van der Meer returned to municipal politics and became interim mayor of Muiden in September 2010. She served until her death in Zutphen on 13 December 2015. De Pater-van der Meer had been appointed to oversee the merger of the municipalities of Muiden, Bussum, Naarden and Weesp.
