= Moscow Symphony Orchestra =

Russian symphony orchestra

Background information
- Also known as: MSO
- Origin: Moscow, Russia
- Genres: Classical
- Occupation: Symphony orchestra
- Years active: 1989–present
- Members: Music Director & Conductor Arthur Arnold
- Website: moscowsymphony.ru/en/welcome

The Moscow Symphony Orchestra is a non-state-supported Russian symphony orchestra, founded in 1989 by the sisters Ellen and Marina Levine. The musicians include graduates from such institutions as Moscow, Kiev, and Saint Petersburg Conservatory. The orchestra has recorded over 100 CDs for Naxos and Marco Polo. The current Music Director is the Dutch conductor Arthur Arnold.

Past Music Directors included Antonio de Almeida and Vladimir Ziva. Moscow Symphony Orchestra performs its Master Series in the historic Grand Hall of Moscow Conservatory. The orchestra has performed with Russian soloists such as Yuri Bashmet, Victor Tretyakov, Vadim Repin, Alexander Knyazev, Alexander Rudin, Alexander Ghindin and Andrei Korobeinikov and with international soloists such as Ana Durlovski and Torleif Thedéen. The MSO has toured to most European countries, as well as Hong Kong, Japan, South Korea, China, Argentina and the United States. The orchestra has also been a regular participant in international music festivals in Germany, Austria, Italy and Cyprus, Argentina.

== Discography ==
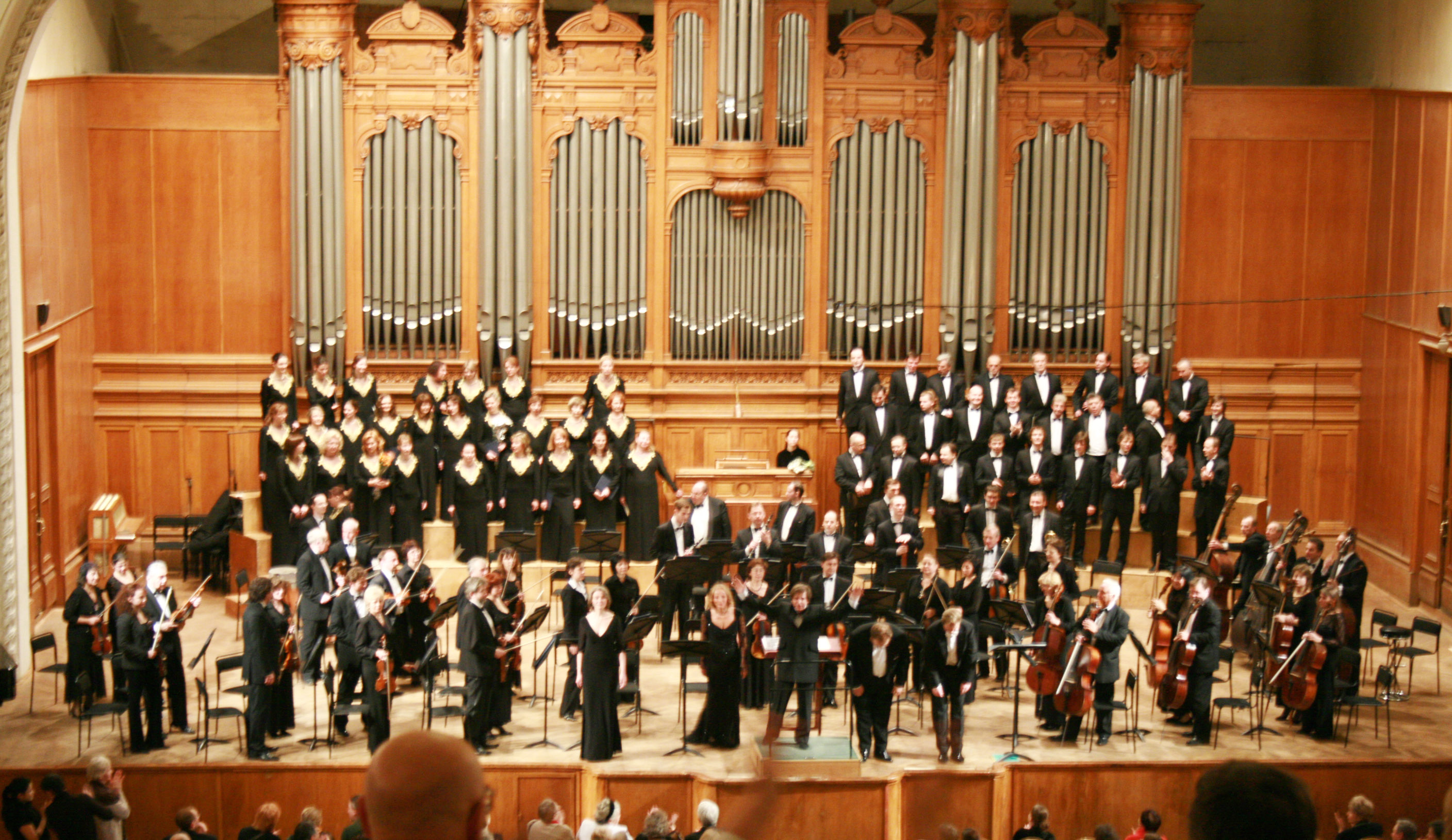

- Discography of the Moscow Symphony Orchestra
