= Arend Braat =

Dutch politician (1874–1947)

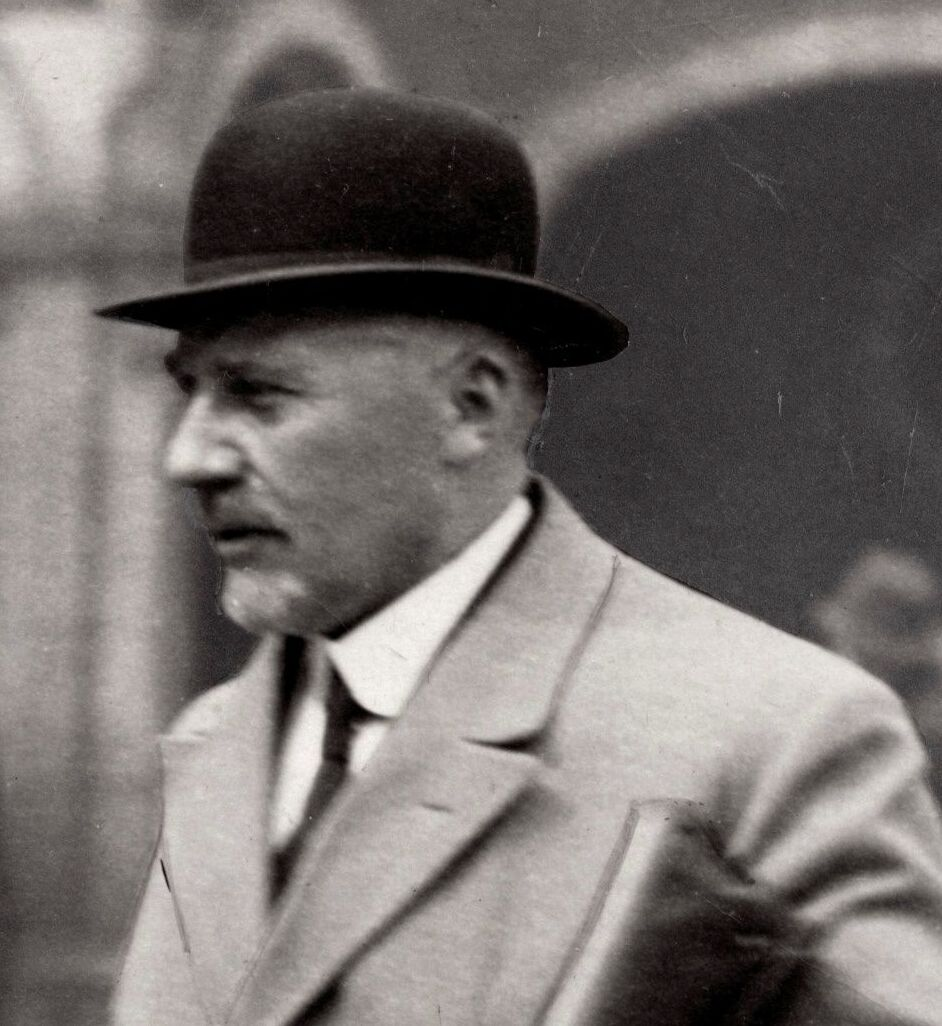
- Arend Braat in 1923

Member of the House of Representatives
- In office 18 September 1919 – 9 May 1933

Personal details
- Born: 15 February 1874 Hekelingen
- Died: 11 January 1947 (aged 72) Hekelingen
- Party: Peasants' League

Arend Braat (15 February 1874 - 11 January 1947) was a Dutch farmer and politician. He was a member of the House of Representatives from 1919 to 1933 as the leader of the Peasants' League until 1932 and for the National Farmers', Horticulturists' and Middle Class Party (NBTMP) until 1933.

== Biography ==
Arend Braat was born on 15 February 1874 in Hekelingen, an isolated island town in South Holland. In 1919, Braat was first elected to the House of Representatives representing the minor Peasants' League. He soon became infamous for his unrefined style and populist rhetoric, becoming a frequent subject of ridicule in the public press and among his fellow politicians. He vehemently criticised what he saw as incompetent urban politicians and calling for a Napoleon-like figure to free the Netherlands from party politics and revolutionary sentiments.

Braat nevertheless became highly popular among a small group of farmers, especially in poor farming towns in Drenthe where the Peasants' League won almost half of the popular vote. He was a staunch opponent of daylight savings time, proposing its abolition six different times between 1921 and 1929, which were all rejected by the House of Representatives with increasingly large margins.

Braat's leadership faced increasing internal opposition due to the Peasants' League's declining electoral fortunes in the 1920s. Whereas the party had won a second seat in the 1922 Dutch general election, it lost that seat in the 1925 general election following a more moderate splinter faction led by Rients Feikes de Boer splitting its vote. After the party was unable to take electoral advantage of the Great Depression, losing nearly all its seats in the 1931 provincial elections, the Peasants' League was refounded as the more ideologically refined National Farmers' Horticulturists' and Middle Class Party (NBTMP), led by Cornelis Vervoorn. It participated in the 1933 Dutch general election but only won a single seat, which meant that Braat was not reelected.

Throughout the 1930s, Braat would develop a growing fascination with fascism. Within fascist circles however, he was seen as an unschooled rabble-rouser emblematic of the failings of democracy. In 1934, Braat tried to join the National Socialist Movement (NSB), but was denied membership the next year.

Arend Braat died on 11 January 1947 in Hekelingen.

== Bibliography ==
- Vossen, Koen (2003). Vrij vissen in het Vondelpark: kleine politieke partijen in Nederland 1918 - 1940 (PDF). Amsterdam: Wereldbibliotheek. ISBN 978-90-284-2009-0.
