= Pampus =

Fortified artificial island on the IJmeer near Amsterdam

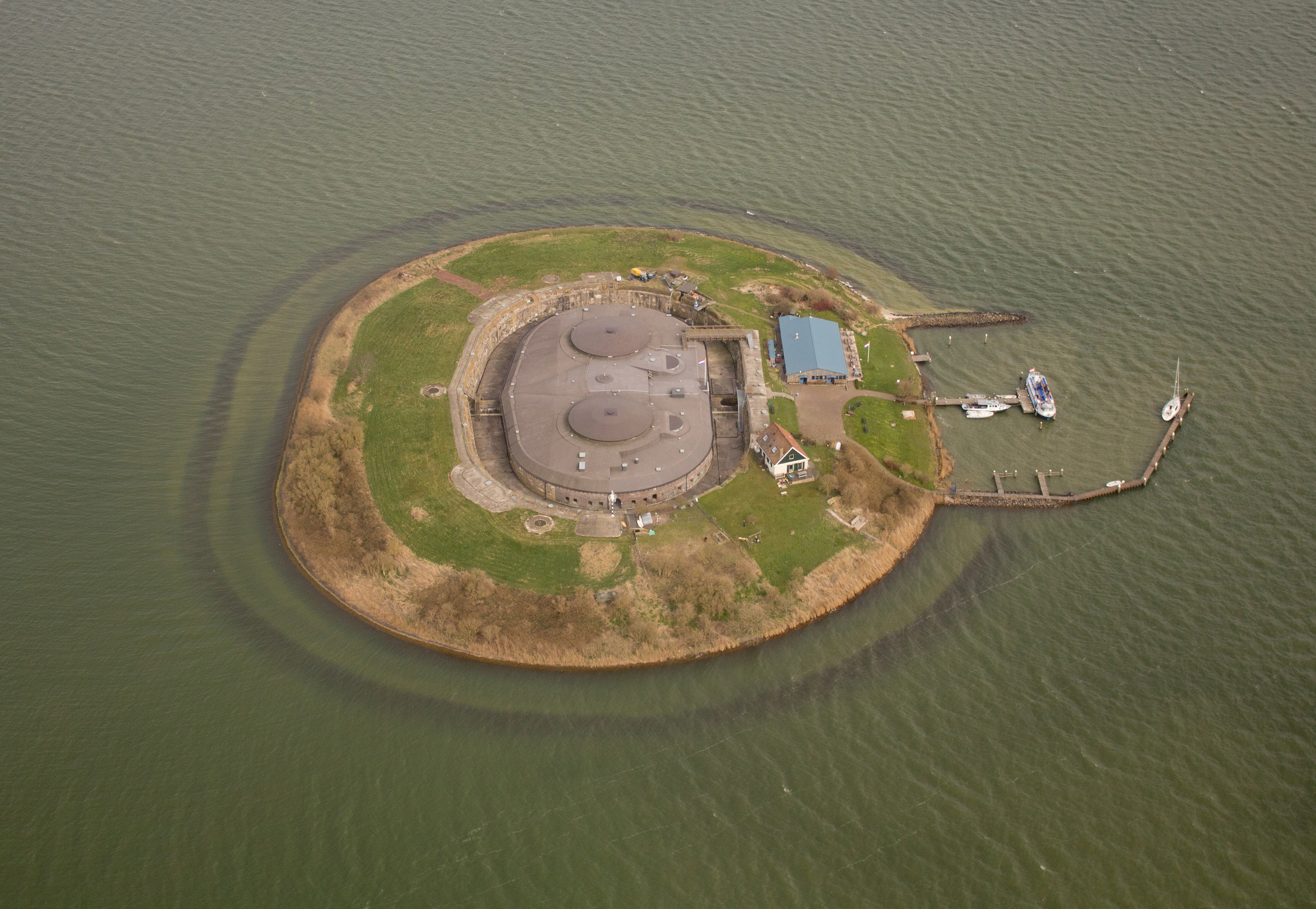
- Pampus island in 2013

- Location within Netherlands

Geography
- Location: IJmeer
- Coordinates: 52°21′53″N 5°4′8″E
- Area: 0.03 km^{2} (0.012 sq mi)
- Length: 205 m (673 ft)
- Width: 164 m (538 ft)

Administration
- Netherlands
- Province: North Holland
- Municipality: Gooise Meren

Demographics
- Population: 2
- Pop. density: 67/km^{2} (174/sq mi)

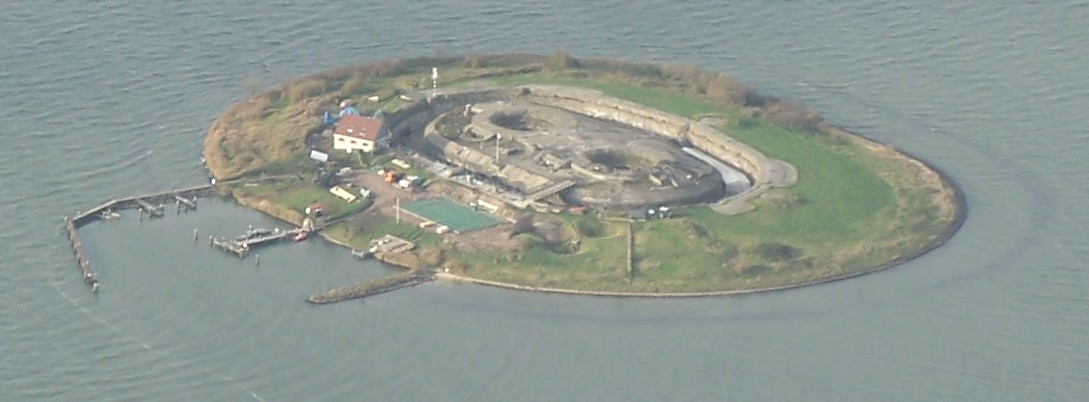
Pampus island prior to restoration in 2004

Pampus (Dutch pronunciation: [ˈpɑmpʏs]) is an artificial island and late 19th-century sea fort located in the IJmeer near Amsterdam. Pampus now belongs to the municipality of Gooise Meren and is open to visitors.

Together with the artillery battery on the lighthouse island near Durgerdam and the battery at the Diemer seawall, Pampus protected the entrance to IJ Bay and the harbour of Amsterdam. Pampus was part of the Defence Line of Amsterdam (Dutch: Stelling van Amsterdam). In 1996, UNESCO designated the entire Defence Line with its 42 forts a World Heritage Site.

== Construction ==
The fort is on a man-made island situated on what was the Pampus shallows or sandbank in the then Zuiderzee. There is a well-known Dutch expression "laying for Pampus" used to describe people that are lying down knocked out. It stems from the time ships had to wait for high tide at Pampus before they could enter the harbour of Amsterdam.

Work commenced in 1887 and creating the island and fort required the sinking of 3,800 piles and the importation of 45 thousand cubic metres of sand. It took the Dutch eight years and ƒ 800,000 (€ 8,559,172) to construct the fort.

The fort is built of bricks and concrete. The fort has an oval shape and the main building has three floors. On the ground floor were the troops' quarters, kitchen, laundry, two coal-fired steam engines of 20 hp, two dynamos, telegraph, first aid station, and magazines. Most classrooms were located on the south side of the fort. An eight-metre dry moat surrounds the building. Tunnels on the north and south connect the ground floor of the building to the counterscarp. The counterscarp is made of concrete and contained a gaol, the forge, and several supply rooms. On top of the counterscarp there is a parapet to provide close-in defence. A large glacis surrounds the whole fort.

== History ==
The fort was commissioned in 1895. It was armed with four Krupp 24 cm K L/35 guns deployed in two hydraulically operated cupolas of two guns each. Electric lifts brought shells and cartridges up from the magazines on the ground floor. These guns fired a shell of 280 kg (617 lb) for a range of up to eight kilometres (5.0 miles). Each gun had a crew of an NCO and six gunners, who could get off one shot every six minutes. A similar, still extant cupola setup, with twin Krupp guns, exists at Fort Copacabana.

Pampus was one of only four forts in the Defence Line armed with large caliber guns. (The other three forts were the forts near IJmuiden, Velsen, and Spijkerboor.) Pampus also had two positions for 57mm (2.2") quick-firing guns for close-in defence. The counterscarp held four M90 Gardner machine guns on garrison mounts for the defence of the moat.

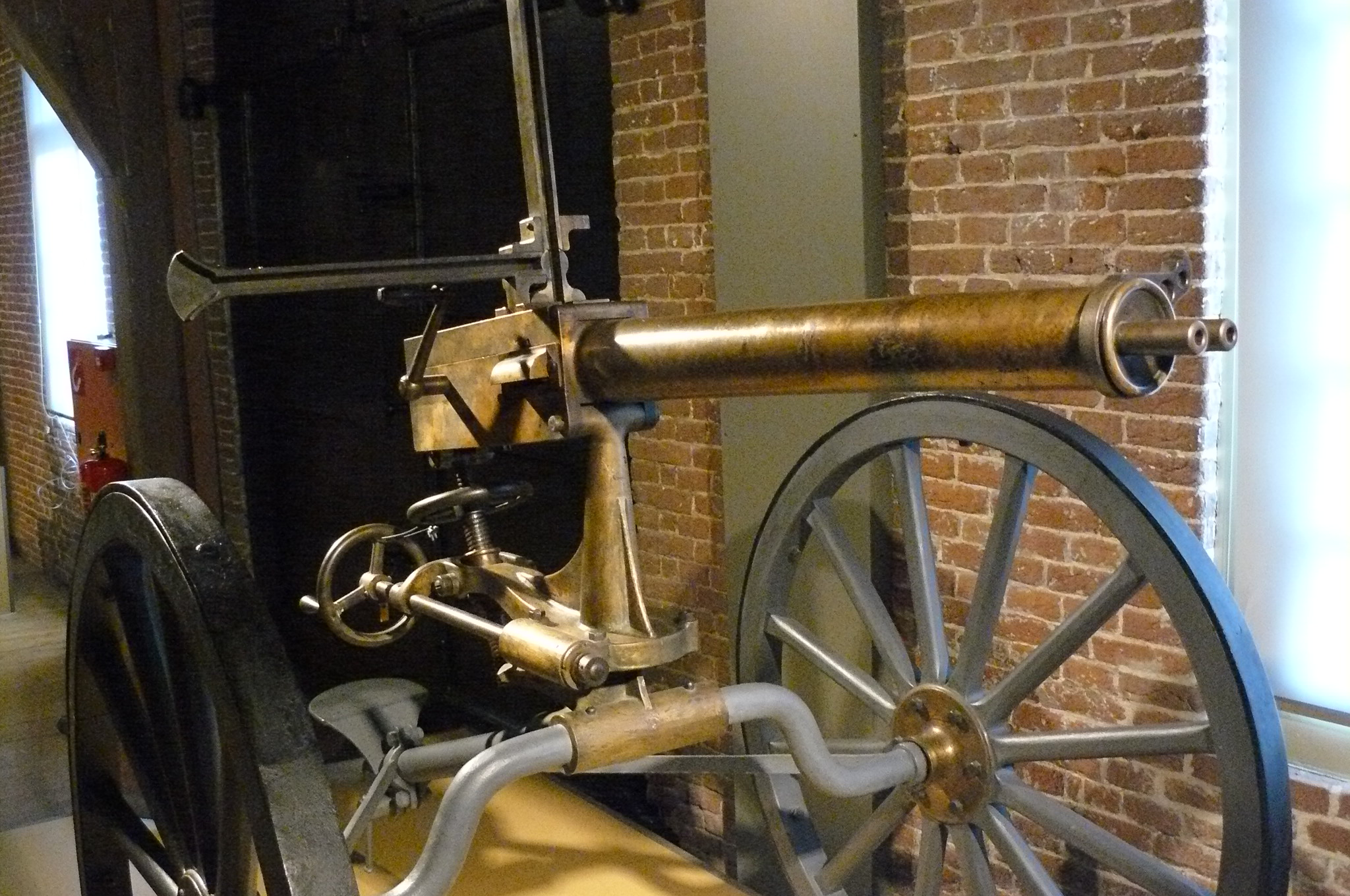
Gardner M90 machine gun on field mount

Pampus had facilities for a permanent garrison of 200 men, but the only time it achieved that strength was during the First World War. In 1926, the fort received emplacements for three anti-aircraft guns. The fort never saw action and the completion in 1932 of the Afsluitdijk cut the IJsselmeer off from the open sea. At this point, Pampus lost its strategic role and on 15 July 1933 the military abandoned it, after having removed the anti-aircraft guns.

During World War II, the German occupation forces removed the Krupp guns, cupolas, and other metal to use for scrap steel. Between 1941 and 1943 they used the fort for target practice, before installing some 88mm (3.5") anti-aircraft guns. The German dive bombers used 250 kg (551 lb) concrete bombs for their practice. These contained a glass tube filled with chemicals. The tube broke on impact, releasing coloured smoke to mark the impact point.

In the bitter winter of 1944, the people of Amsterdam walked across the ice to salvage the wood in the fort to burn for warmth. After the German surrender, the authorities used the island for the disposal of unexploded ordnance. Ammunition that no longer could be defused was detonated.

There were some plans in 1951 to site an anti-aircraft battery there, but on 9 October 1952 the fort was declared surplus and was transferred to the civilian authorities for disposal.

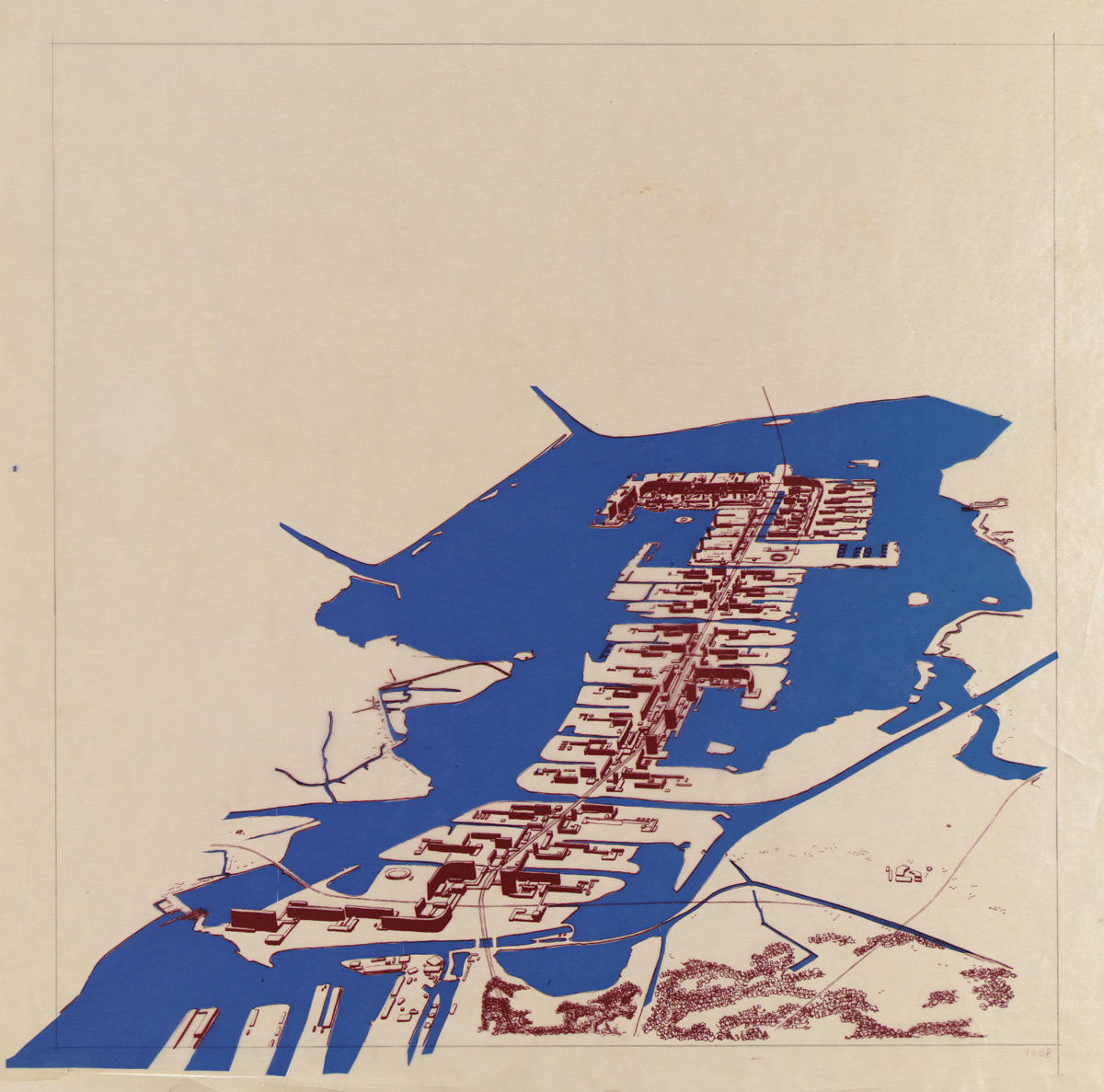
Pampus Expansion Plan (1965)

In 1965, the architectural firm Van den Broek & Bakema, comprising architects Jo van den Broek and Jaap Bakema, were commissioned to create a plan for a city on the island; this was never built.

In June 1985, the government scouted the fort with an eye to restoring the island and make it accessible to the public. Plans were drafted in the next year and the Pampus Foundation (Stichting Pampus) was established to bring these plans to fruition. The Foundation bought the fort in 1990, and in 1992 the fort received a caretaker. Since then, the fort has been occupied continuously.

There is still one gun at Pampus, an 88 mm (3.5 in) from a German minesweeper that was wrecked during storm in 1917 north of the island of Terschelling. Many years after the vessel's loss, dredging fortuitously recovered the gun, which ended up being donated to the Pampus Foundation. The gun was installed at the harbour of Pampus on 4 February 2003.

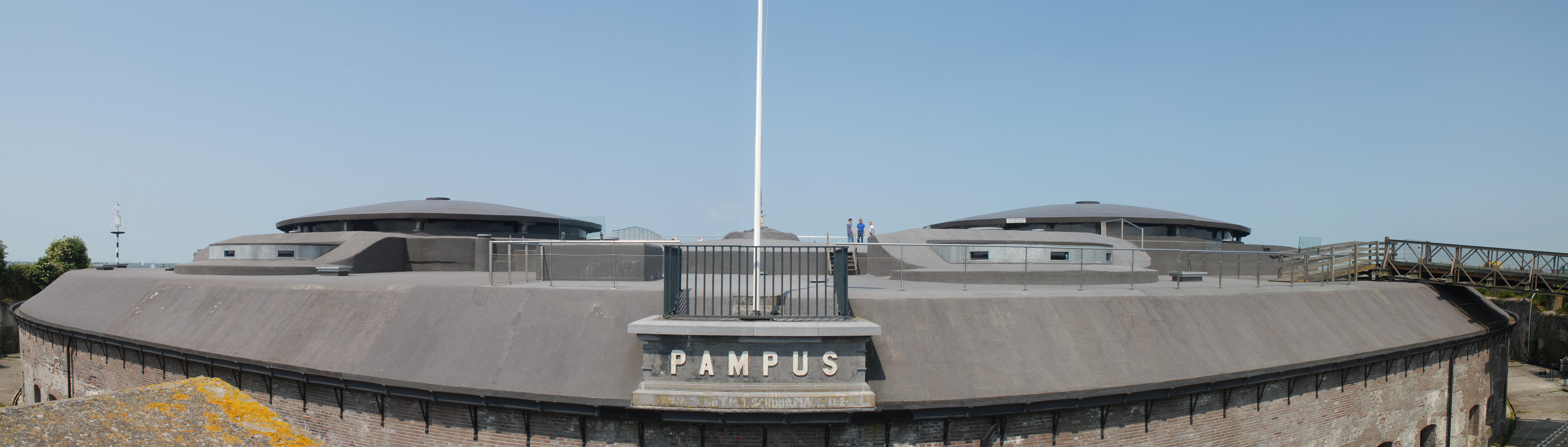
Panorama of the fort in 2013

== Current status ==
In 2007, the fortress was partially restored. It is open to the public from April to October, Tuesday to Sunday; €17.50 admission includes both fort and round-trip ferry from Muiden. The island is roughly three kilometres from the coast and the Muiden ferry takes around 20 minutes to get there. There are also direct ferries from Amsterdam, and one can reach the fort by private vessel.

== Named after the island ==
- In 1946, a British ship named Empire Lily was allocated to the Dutch government, which renamed her Pampus.
- Aviation radio beacon PAM (Pampus) VOR

== Bibliography ==
- Stuten (1893). "Notulen der vergadering van den 13den september 1892". Tijdschrift van het Koninklijk Instituut van Ingenieurs. KNVI.
