= Cornelis Vervoorn (politician) =

Dutch farmer and politician (1883–1951)

- Cornelis Vervoorn in 1933

Member of the House of Representatives
- In office 9 May 1933 – 8 June 1937

Personal details
- Born: 9 March 1883 Herwijnen, Netherlands
- Died: 11 November 1951 (aged 68) Herwijnen, Netherlands
- Party: Peasants' League (until 1932); NBTM (from 1932)
- Education: Utrecht University

Cornelis Vervoorn (9 March 1883 – 11 November 1951) was a Dutch lawyer, farmer, and politician. From 1933 to 1937, Vervoorn served as a member of the Dutch House of Representatives for the National Farmers', Horticulturists' and Middle Class Party (NBTM), the successor of the Peasants' League led by Arend Braat.

== Early life ==
Cornelis Vervoorn was born on 9 March 1883 in Herwijnen to Hendrikus Jacobus Vervoorn and Magdalena de Bruijn. The Vervoorn family was wealthy and owned several houses and large amounts of land in the vicinity of Herwijnen. After attending secondary school in Gorinchem, Vervoorn began studying law at Utrecht University, graduating in 1910. Vervoorn subsequently practiced law in Utrecht for a period, before returning to Herwijnen in 1922 where he became a gentleman farmer.

== Political career ==
Vervoorn first entered politics as a member of the Peasants' League, which was led by the controversial MP Arend Braat, in 1923, when Vervoorn was elected to the Provincial Council of Gelderland. Despite his general fiscal conservatism, Vervoorn supported infrastructure projects in rural areas, as well as fiscal measures to help struggling farmers during the Great Depression. He also advocated against granting government subsidies to Christian schools, which he viewed as special privileges not in the general interest. In 1927, Vervoorn was elected into the Herwijnen municipal council, and became an alderman there the same year.

Vervoorn became vice-chairman of the national Peasants' League in 1925, being promoted to chairman in September 1930. Within the party, Vervoorn led a faction which sought to turn the Peasants' League from a protest party to one with a more formalized ideology and political program. As chairman, Vervoorn managed to rename the Peasants' League to the National Farmers', Horticulturists' and Middle Class Party (Nationale Boeren-, Tuinders- en Middenstandspartij, NBTM), and to adopt a program which emphasized conservatism, an adherence to Christian values, opposition to universal suffrage, and a corporatist economic model. It also saw agriculture as "the most important source of prosperity" economically, and agitated against the government's perceived lack of attention for rural interests.

For the 1933 Dutch general election, Vervoorn was placed on the electoral list of the NBTM in three provinces of the Northern Netherlands. Despite receiving fewer votes than Braat was granted the party's only seat in the House of Representatives, over Braat's protests. In contrast to his controversial and widely disliked predecessor, Vervoorn did not play a very important role as an MP. As an MP, Vervoorn supported farmers' interests, austerity, protectionism, and public education. The NBTM had entered into decline by the middle of the 1930s, losing much of their support to other parties such as the Christian Democratic Union and the National Socialist Movement (NSB). Vervoorn lost his seat in the House of Representatives in the 1937 Dutch general election.

== Later life ==
After leaving the House of Representatives, Vervoorn remained active in local politics in Herwijnen, serving as alderman until the Second World War and as municipal councilor until his death.

Cornelis Vervoorn died on 11 November 1951 in Herwijnen.

== Bibliography ==
- Vossen, Koen (2003). Vrij vissen in het Vondelpark: kleine politieke partijen in Nederland 1918 - 1940 (PDF). Amsterdam: Wereldbibliotheek. ISBN 978-90-284-2009-0.
