= Muiden =

- City and former municipality
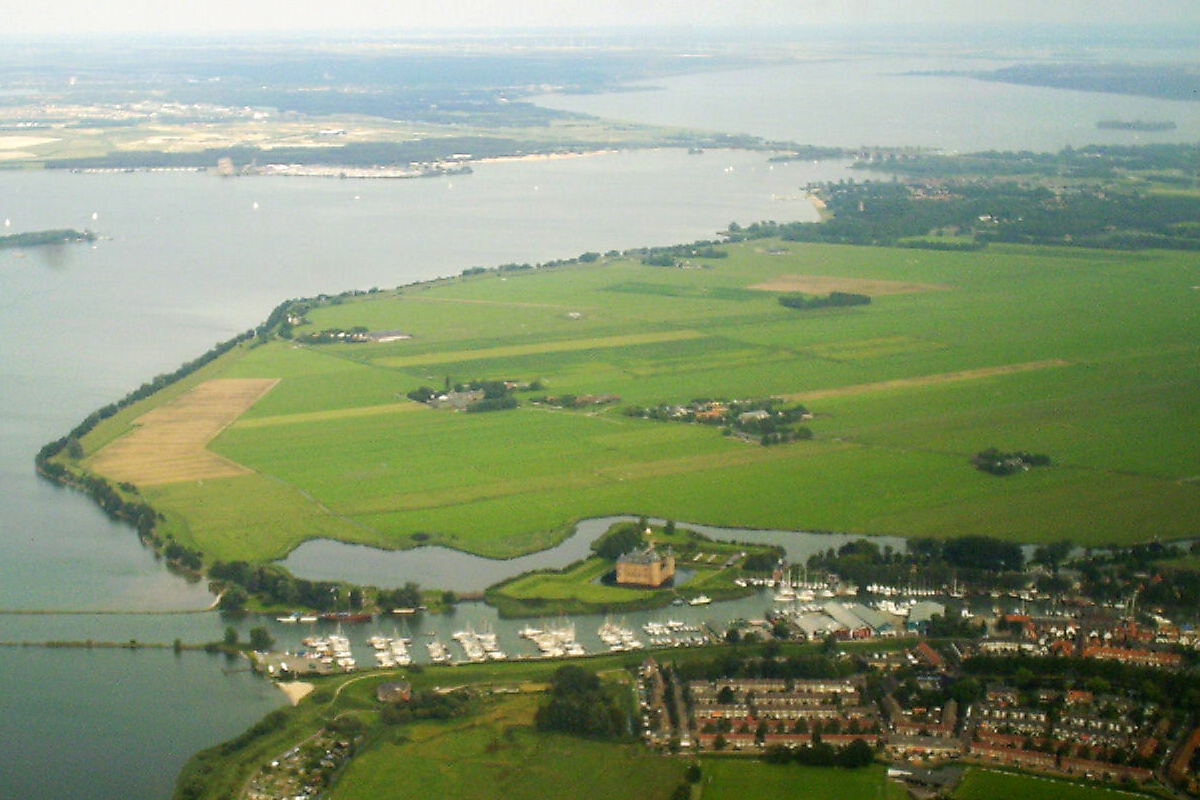
- Aerial view of Muiden and Muiderslot

- Flag Coat of arms

- Location in the Netherlands Location in the province of North Holland in the Netherlands
- Coordinates: 52°20′N 5°4′E
- Country: Netherlands
- Province: North Holland
- Municipality: Gooise Meren

Area
  - Total: 13.07 km^{2} (5.05 sq mi)
- Elevation: 0 m (0 ft)

Population (2021)
  - Total: 7,200
  - Density: 550/km^{2} (1,400/sq mi)
- Time zone: UTC+1 (CET)
  - Summer (DST): UTC+2 (CEST)
- Postcode: 1398–1399
- Area code: 0294
- Website: www.muiden.nl

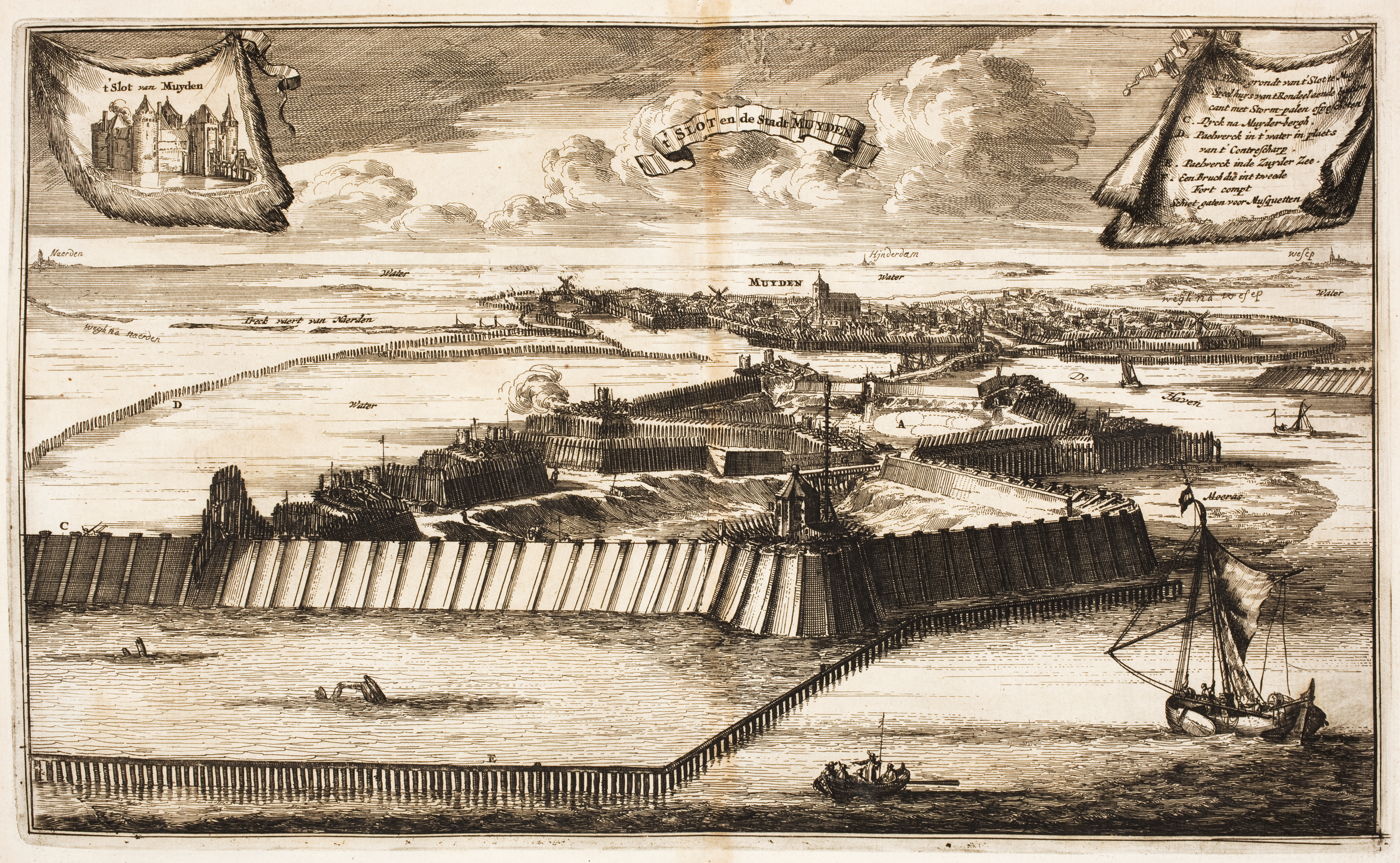
Flooding of the area around Muiden in the Old Hollandic Water Line to block French troops in 1672

Muiden (Dutch pronunciation: [ˈmœydə(n)]) is a city and former municipality in the Netherlands, in the province of North Holland. It lies at the mouth of the Vecht and is in an area called the Vechtstreek. Since 2016, Muiden has been part of the new municipality of Gooise Meren.

== History ==
The first known reference to Muiden is from 953 when Otto I, Holy Roman Emperor, granted the settlement and its toll rights to the Cathedral of Saint Martin, Utrecht. It was called Amuda, meaning "mouth of the (river) A". "A" was the old name for the Vecht river.

In 1122 Muiden was, together with Utrecht, granted some city rights by Emperor Henry V. After the lands around Muiden were given to Count Floris V, he began building Muider Castle at the mouth of the Vecht river. Muiden once again received city rights in 1296.

The first defensive works date from the first half of the 15th century. In 1590 the walls were replaced with earthen mounds with bastions after a design by Adriaen Anthonisz. Muiden was the northern end of the Dutch Water Line.

In 1673 the sea lock in the Vecht river was relocated from Fort Hinderdam to Muiden and in 1676 it was expanded with a sea wall along the Vecht mouth to prevent flooding.

Developments in warfare during the Franco-Prussian War of 1870 prompted modernisation, with the construction of forts, part of the Stelling van Amsterdam, which included the Muizenfort, the barracks on the Vestingplein, and the casemates in the ravelins. The layout of the fortification wall was revised.

Fort Pampus Island, part of the former municipality of Muiden, was built from 1887 to 1897. Together with the lighthouse island near Durgerdam and the artillery battery at the Diemer seawall, it was meant to protect the entrance of the IJ Bay and the harbour of Amsterdam.

== Geography ==
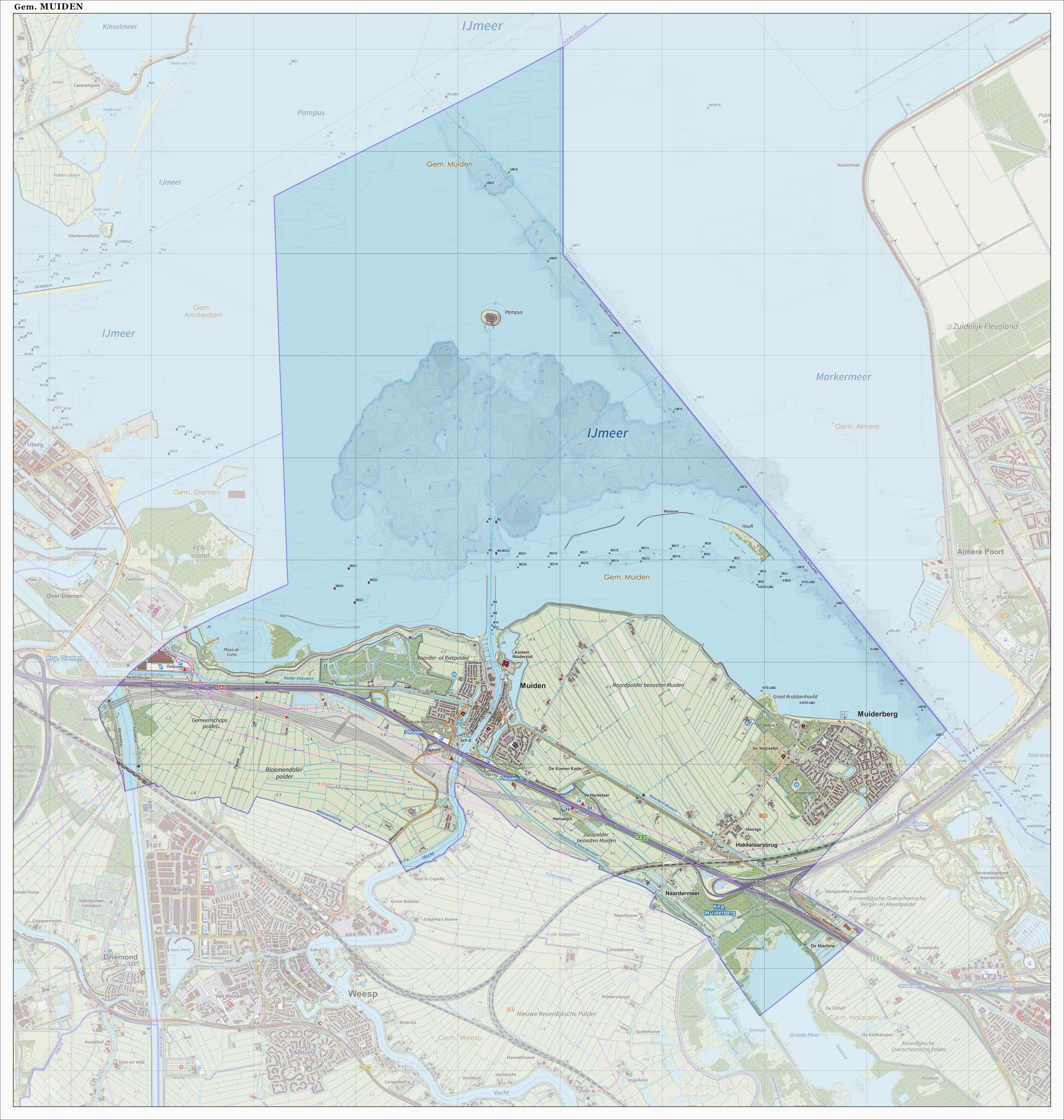
Map of the former municipality of Muiden, June 2015

The former municipality of Muiden had two population centers: Muiden and Muiderberg.

== Attractions ==
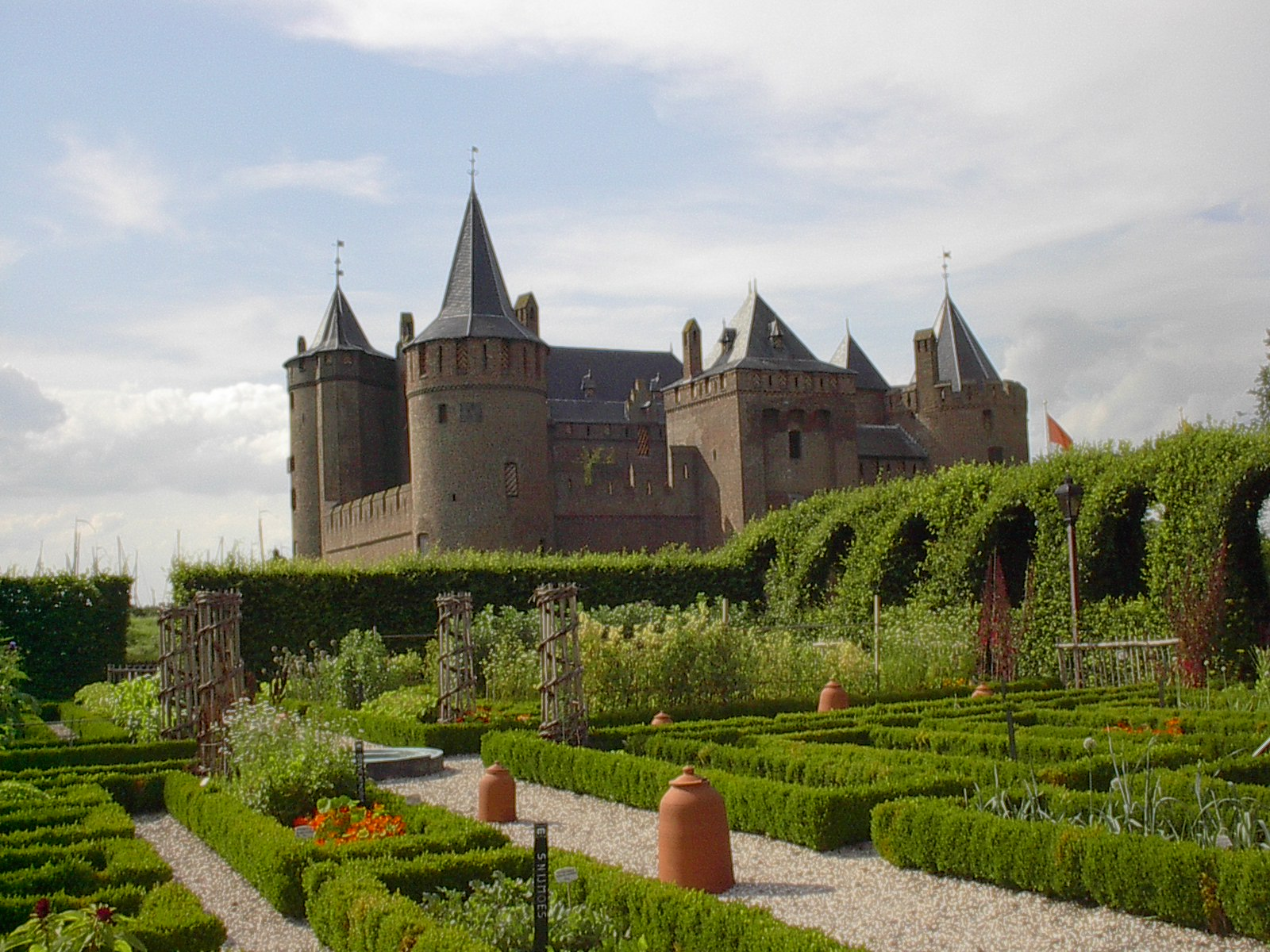
Muiderslot in 2007

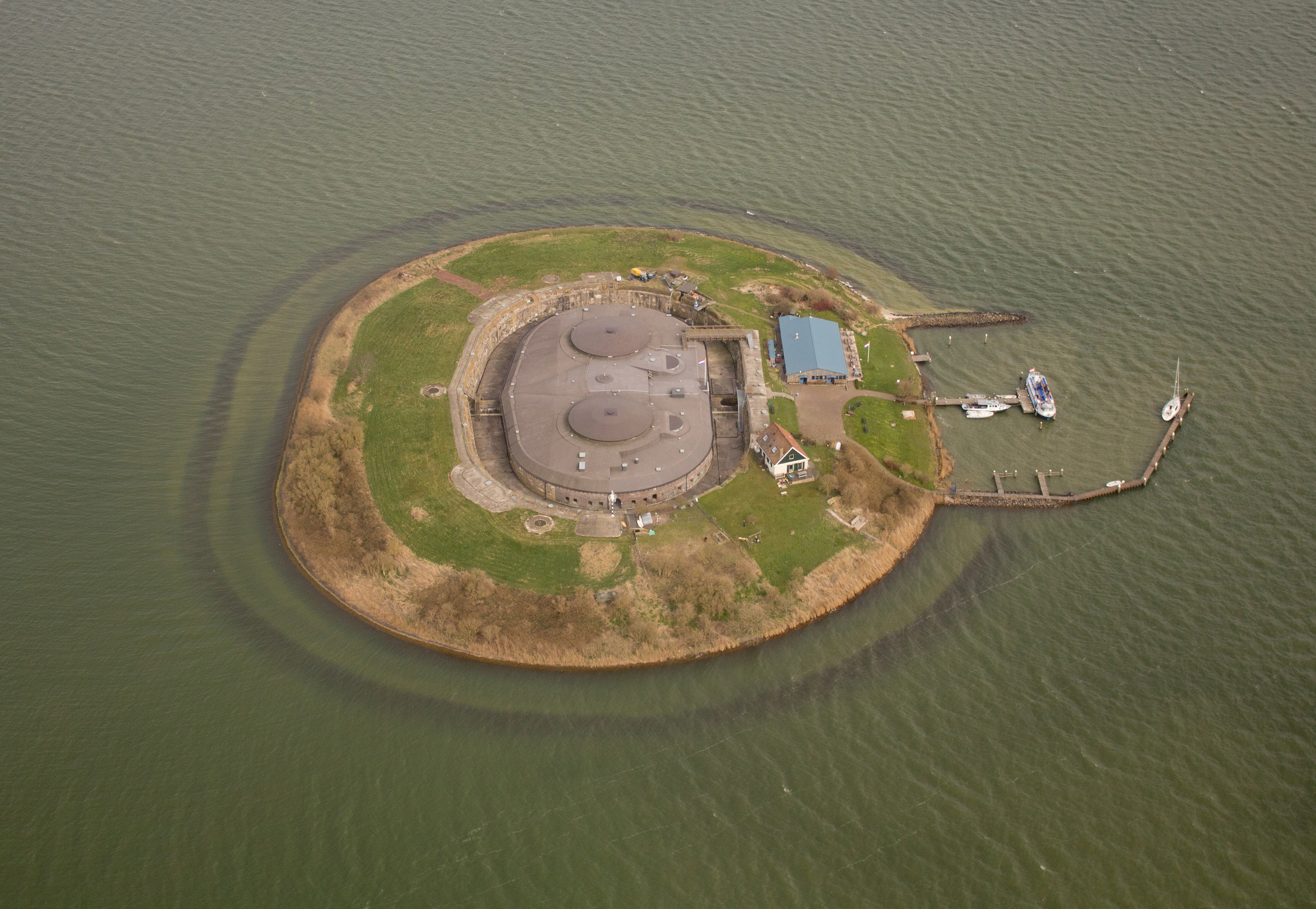
Fort Pampus in 2013

- Muiderslot (Muider Castle), a well-preserved castle from the Middle Ages
- Muizenfort, (Mice Fort) a 19th-century fortification part of the Stelling van Amsterdam
- Fort Pampus Island is an artificial island that is part of the Defence Line of Amsterdam (Dutch: Stelling van Amsterdam).

Various regional walking and cycling routes pass Muiden.

== Gunpowder factory ==
In 1702 the hazardous production of gunpowder was removed from the city of Amsterdam. The vroedschap of Muiden granted a permit to Reinier van Cuyk of Amsterdam to build a gunpowder mill just west of Muiden that same year.

The factory flourished during the First World War, was liquidated in 1919, and was restarted in 1922. During the 20th century its production steadily increased and the town grew towards the factory. In 1972 it was renamed "Muiden Chemie". In the 1980s, it was accused of illegal shipments to Iran. In 1990 Muiden Chemie went bankrupt and was taken over by the British company Royal Ordnance, part of British Aerospace. After a fire in 2001 and ongoing concerns over safety, it was decided to close the factory permanently.

Explosions since 1883:

- January 9, 1883: explosion on the factory premises, resulting in 13 deaths and much damage to the factory and Muiden.
- 1886: explosion, 2 deaths. Destroyed a part of the factory.
- 1924/1925: several explosions, 1 death.
- January 17, 1947: explosion of collected grenades on the factory premises, 17 deaths and much damage in Muiden.
- 1948: a grenade exploded, 1 death.
- 1949: explosion in a powder mill, 1 death.
- June 13, 1963: explosion in the storage depot, no casualties.
- June 2, 1966: explosion in the TNT factory, many injuries and much damage in Muiden.
- December 8, 1972: explosion in drying chamber, 2 deaths, much damage in Muiden.
- May 30, 1983: explosion, 3 deaths.
- September 9, 1983: explosion, 1 death.
- August 20, 2001: fire in packing materials storage, no explosions, no casualties.

== Local government ==
Marleen de Pater-van der Meer of the Christian Democratic Appeal (CDA) was the last mayor of Muiden. The municipal council of Muiden consisted of 13 seats, which were divided as follows at the 2014 local elections:

- People's Party for Freedom and Democracy (VVD): 3 seats
- Labour Party (PvdA): 3 seats
- Democrats 66 (D66): 3 seats
- Christian Democratic Appeal (CDA): 2 seats
- Ons Muiden Muiderberg: 2 seats

There was an election in November 2015 for the council for the new merged Gooise Meren municipality that commenced work on 1 January 2016, replacing Muiden council.

== Notable people ==
- Abraham Samson Onderwijzer (1862–1934), rabbi and labour union founder
