= Arthur Arnold (conductor) =

Dutch orchestra conductor

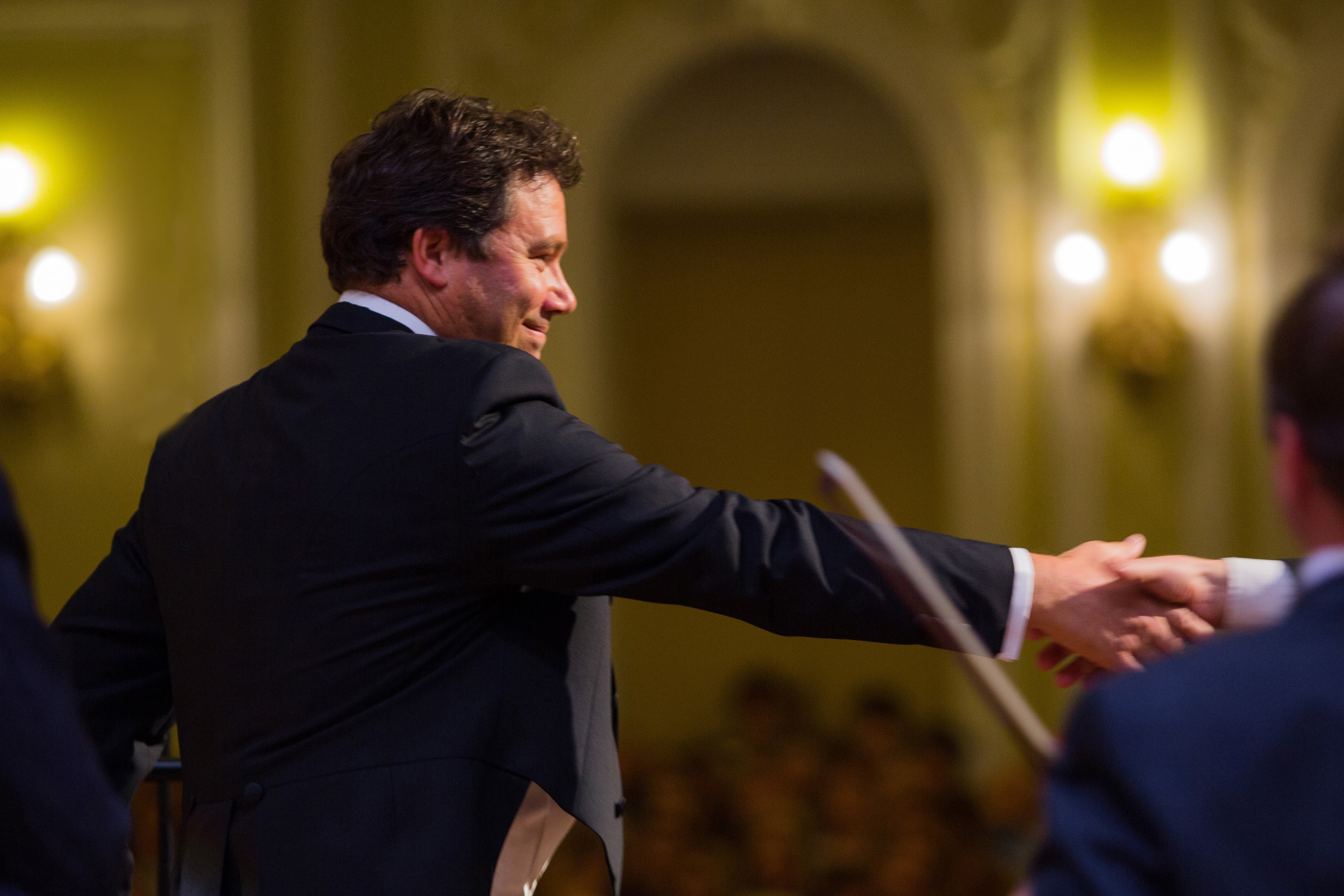
- Arthur Arnold with the Moscow Symphony Orchestra
- Born: 5 April 1967 (age 59); Naarden, Netherlands
- Education: Conservatorium van Amsterdam
- Occupations: Conductor of classical music (active 1997–present)
- Known for: Conductor of the Moscow Symphony Orchestra
- Website: arthurarnold.com

Arthur Arnold (born in Naarden, 5 April 1967) is a Dutch orchestra conductor, currently based in Powell River, British Columbia, Canada.

Arnold studied cello at the Maastricht Academy of Music and the Conservatorium van Amsterdam with Dmitri Ferschtman, and later in London with Christopher Bunting. He played cello in several orchestras, including Conjuncto Iberico and the Netherlands Philharmonic Orchestra. He studied conducting with Anton Kersjes at the Maastricht Academy of Music and took private lessons with Marcello Viotti, Jean Fournet and Graeme Jenkins. He attended masterclasses with Jorma Panula in Moscow and Amsterdam, with Myung Whun Chung and Gianluigi Gelmetti at the Accademia Musicale Chigiana in Siena, Italy, and Diego Masson at the Darlington School of Arts in the UK. Arnold was also an assistant conductor to Hans Vonk.

Arnold was principal guest conductor of the Seoul National Symphony Orchestra from 1997 to 2001. He first guest-conducted the Moscow Symphony Orchestra in 2001, at the Royal Concertgebouw in Amsterdam. He subsequently became the orchestra's principal guest conductor, and music director in 2012, until his resignation in March 2022, in response to the Russian invasion of Ukraine.

Following an appearance as a guest conductor at the Kathaumixw International Choral Festival in Powell River in 2000, he made frequent return visits to Powell River, and later married a woman from the city. In Powell River, Arnold co-founded the Symphony Orchestra Academy of the Pacific (SOAP) in 2004, and served as its music director until the suspension of SOAP in 2012. SOAP subsequently was reorganised into the Pacific Region International Summer Music Association (PRISMA festival & Academy), and Arnold took up its music directorship. Arnold has premiered several works of Canadian composer Tobin Stokes, including two of his operas, The Vine Dressers and Rattenbury. He has also spearheaded the creation of a performance hall and community arts hub to serve both PRISMA and other community arts groups.

In 2018 Arnold started the Mosolov Project after he discovered unpublished manuscripts of Alexander Mosolov in Russian libraries. With the Moscow Symphony Orchestra, he subsequently recorded and released several albums of Mosolov's compositions, sparking a resurgence of interest in the composer's work.

In 2025, a radio documentary on CBC Radio One's The Current profiled Arnold and the positive effects that his vision of community building through the arts is having on Powell River, a community in flux since the closure of the town's primary employer in the early 2020s.
