= Abraham Samson Onderwijzer =

Dutch rabbi

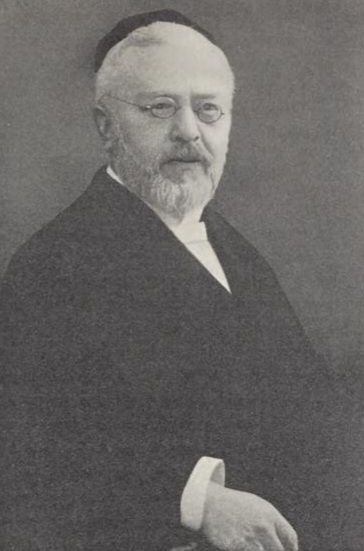
Abraham Samson Onderwijzer

Abraham ben Samson ha-Kohen Onderwijzer (24 July 1862, Muiden - 17 November 1934, Amsterdam) was a Dutch rabbi. He was chief rabbi of North Holland and founder of the Jewish labor union Betsalel.

== Biography ==
Abraham Samson Onderwijzer was born in Muiden. He studied at the Amsterdam Rabbinical Seminary under Rabbi Dr. Joseph Hirsch Dünner. He also studied at the University of Amsterdam, from which he graduated in 1884 with a bachelor's degree in the classics. In 1886, he was ordained as rabbi.

Onderwijzer was appointed rabbi of the Ashkenazi community in Amsterdam on 5 July 1888. On 12 June 1889 he married Lea Wagenaar. They had nine children. In 1895, Rabbi Onderwijzer published a translation of the Pentateuch and Rashi's notes.

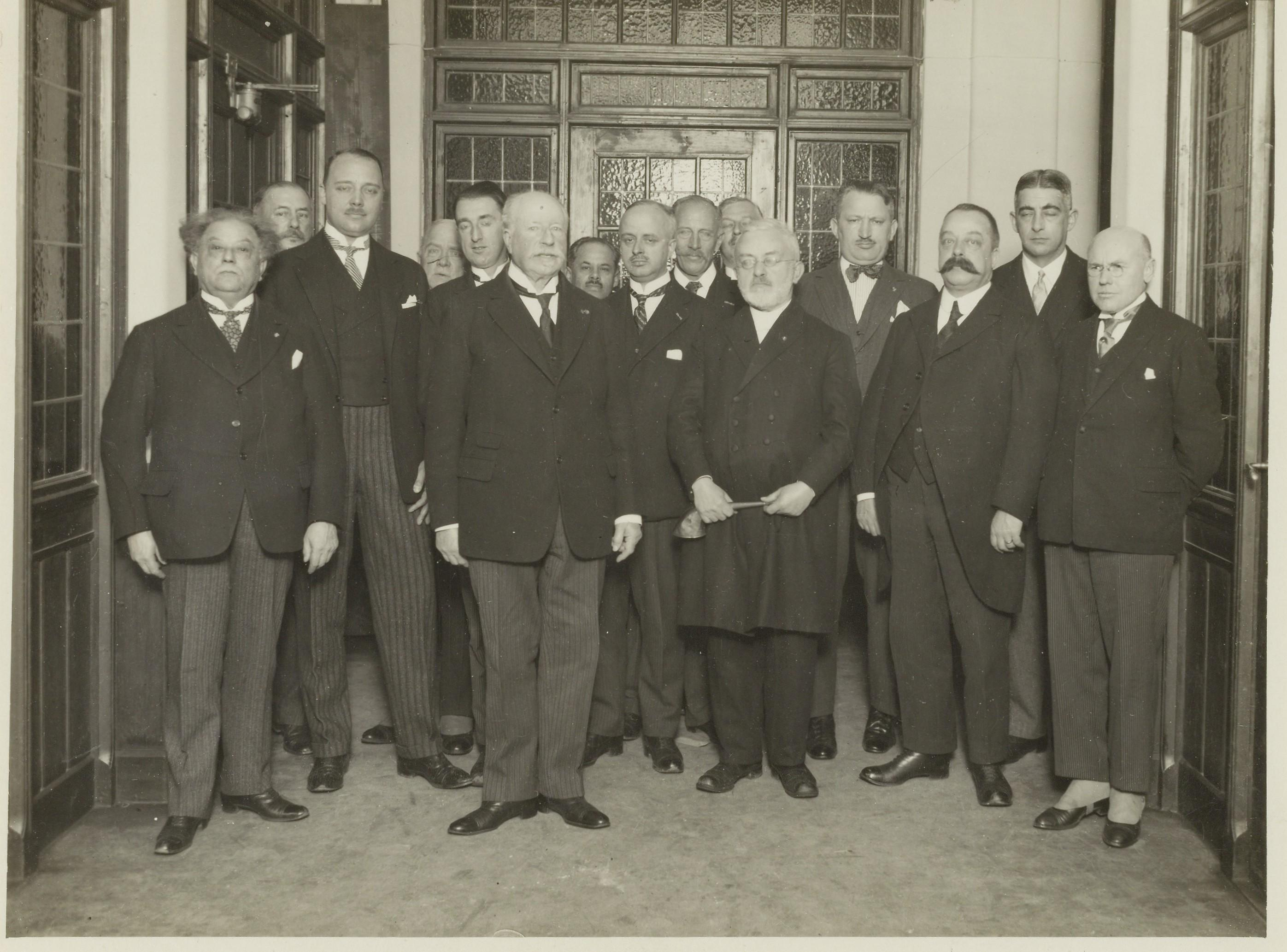
Abraham Samson Onderwijzer (first row, third from right) in 1928

On 29 October 1895 he founded the Jewish labor-union Betsalel, of which he was the honorary president. Bezaleel cared especially for the religious needs of its members (200 in 1904), who were for the greater part diamond-workers. With the other congregational unions of Amsterdam, Patrimonium and St. Eduardus, it supported the Algemeene Nederlandsche Diamantbewerkers Bond (ANDBB), though Betsalel was entirely independent of that organization.

Rabbi Onderwijzer died in 1934 after a collision with a tram in Amsterdam. The A.S. Onderwijzerhof, a street in the center of Amsterdam located near the Joods Historisch Museum (Jewish Historical Museum), was named in his memory.
