= Muiden Castle =

Castle at the mouth of the Vecht river in the Netherlands

- Muiderslot
- Muiden, the Netherlands
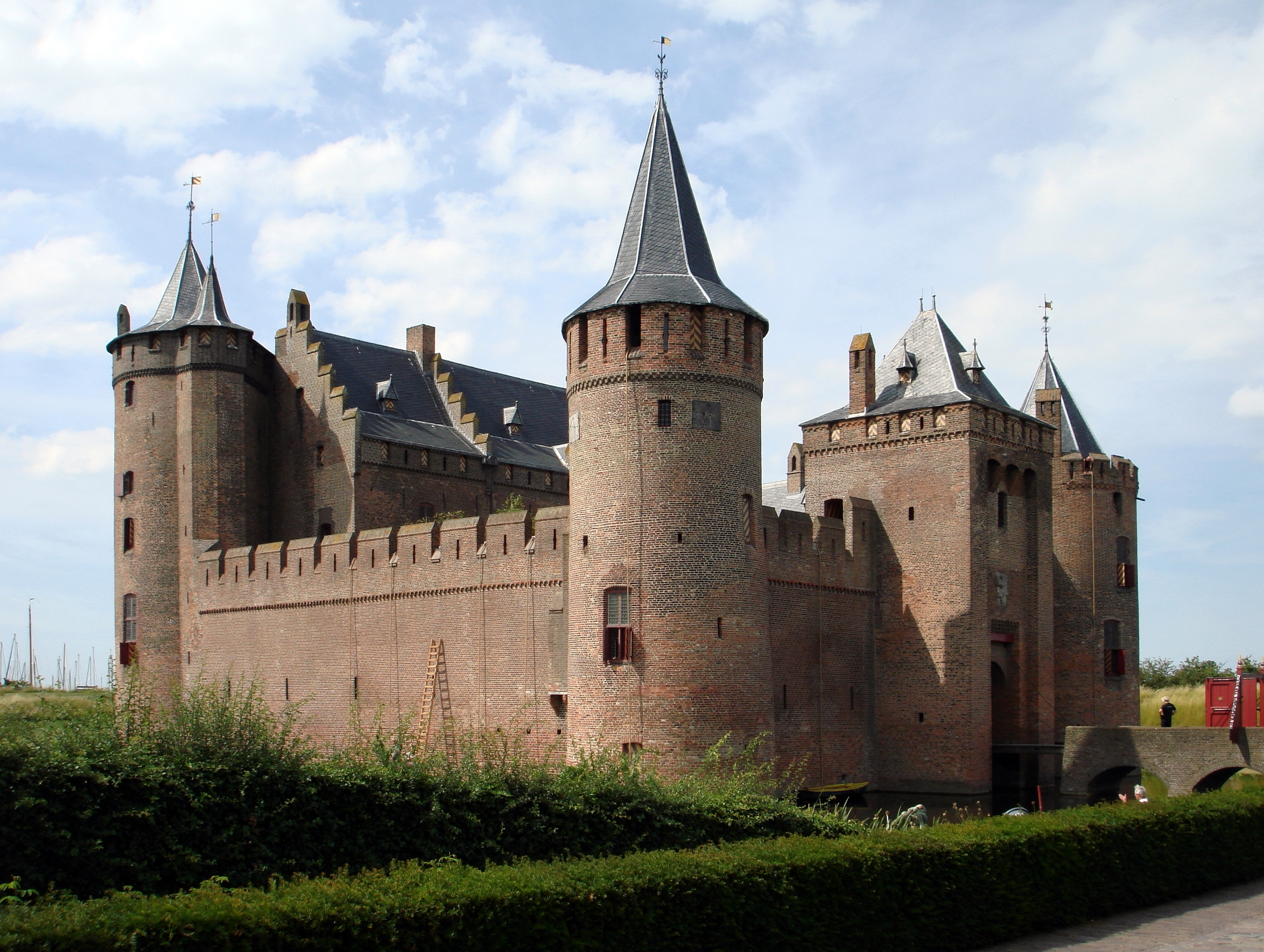
- Muiden Castle

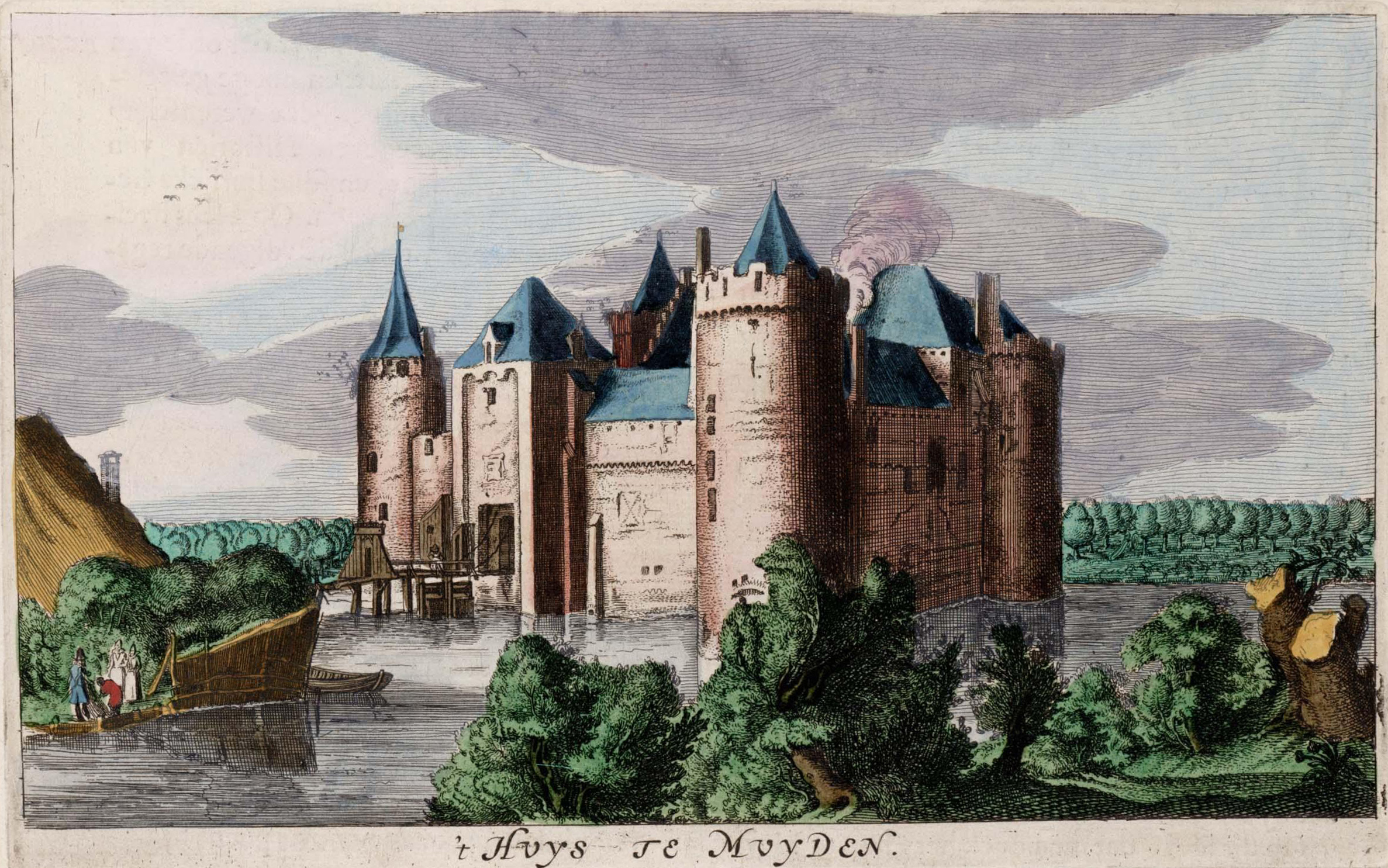
- Atlas van Loon (1649)

Site information
- Type: Castle
- Open to the public: Yes
- Condition: Good

Location
- The Netherlands
- Coordinates: 52.3343°N 5.0714°E

Site history
- Built: 1370
- Built by: Albrecht, Duke of Bavaria

Muiden Castle (Dutch: Muiderslot, Dutch pronunciation: [ˌmœydərˈslɔt]) is a castle in the Netherlands, located at the mouth of the Vecht river, some 15 kilometers southeast of Amsterdam, in Muiden, where it flows into what used to be the Zuiderzee. It is one of the better known castles in the Netherlands and featured in many television shows set in the Middle Ages.

== History ==
=== Floris V ===
The history of Muiden Castle begins with Count Floris V who built a stone castle at the mouth of the river in 1280, when he gained command over an area that used to be part of the See of Utrecht. The Vecht river was the trade route to Utrecht, one of the most important trade towns of that age. The castle was used to enforce a toll on the traders. It is a relatively small castle, measuring 32 by 35 metres with brick walls well over 1.5 metres thick. A large moat surrounded the castle.

In 1296, Gerard van Velsen conspired together with Herman van Woerden, Gijsbrecht IV of Amstel, and several others to kidnap Floris V. The count was eventually imprisoned in Muiden Castle. After Floris V attempted to escape, Gerard personally killed the count on the 27th of June 1296 by stabbing him 20 times. The alleged cause of the conflict between the nobles was the rape of Gerard van Velsen's wife by Floris.

In 1297, the castle was conquered by Willem van Mechelen, the Archbishop of Utrecht, and by the year 1300 the castle was demolished.

=== Fourteenth century ===
A hundred years later (ca. 1370–1386) the castle was rebuilt on the same spot based on the same plan, by Albert I, Duke of Bavaria, who at that time was also the Count of Holland and Zeeland.

=== P.C. Hooft ===
The next owner of the castle shows up in the 16th century, when P.C. Hooft (1581-1647), an author, poet and historian took over sheriff and bailiff duties for the area (Het Gooiland). For 39 years he spent his summers in the castle and invited friends, scholars, poets and painters such as Vondel, Huygens, Bredero and Maria Tesselschade Visscher, over for visits. This group became known as the Muiderkring. He also extended the garden and the plum orchard, while at the same time an outer earthworks defense system was put into place.

=== 18th and 19th century ===
At the end of the 18th century, the castle was first used as a prison, then abandoned and became derelict. Further neglect caused it to be offered for sale in 1825, with the purpose of it being demolished. Only intervention by King William I prevented this. Another 70 years went by until enough money was gathered to restore the castle to its former glory.

=== Modern times ===
Muiden Castle is currently a national museum. The inside of the castle, its rooms and kitchens, was restored to look like they did in the 17th century and several of the rooms now house a collection of arms and armour.

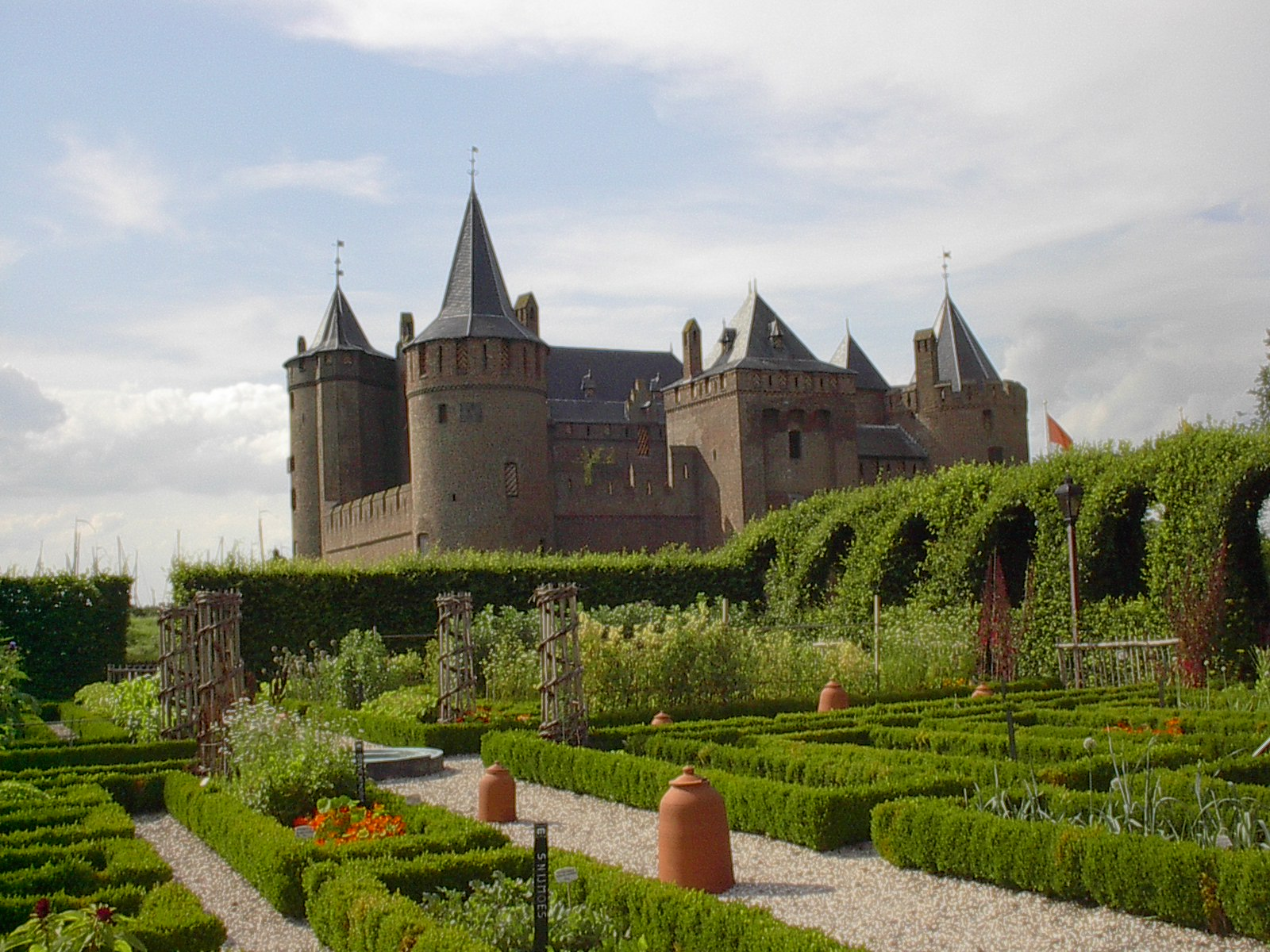
Muiden Castle

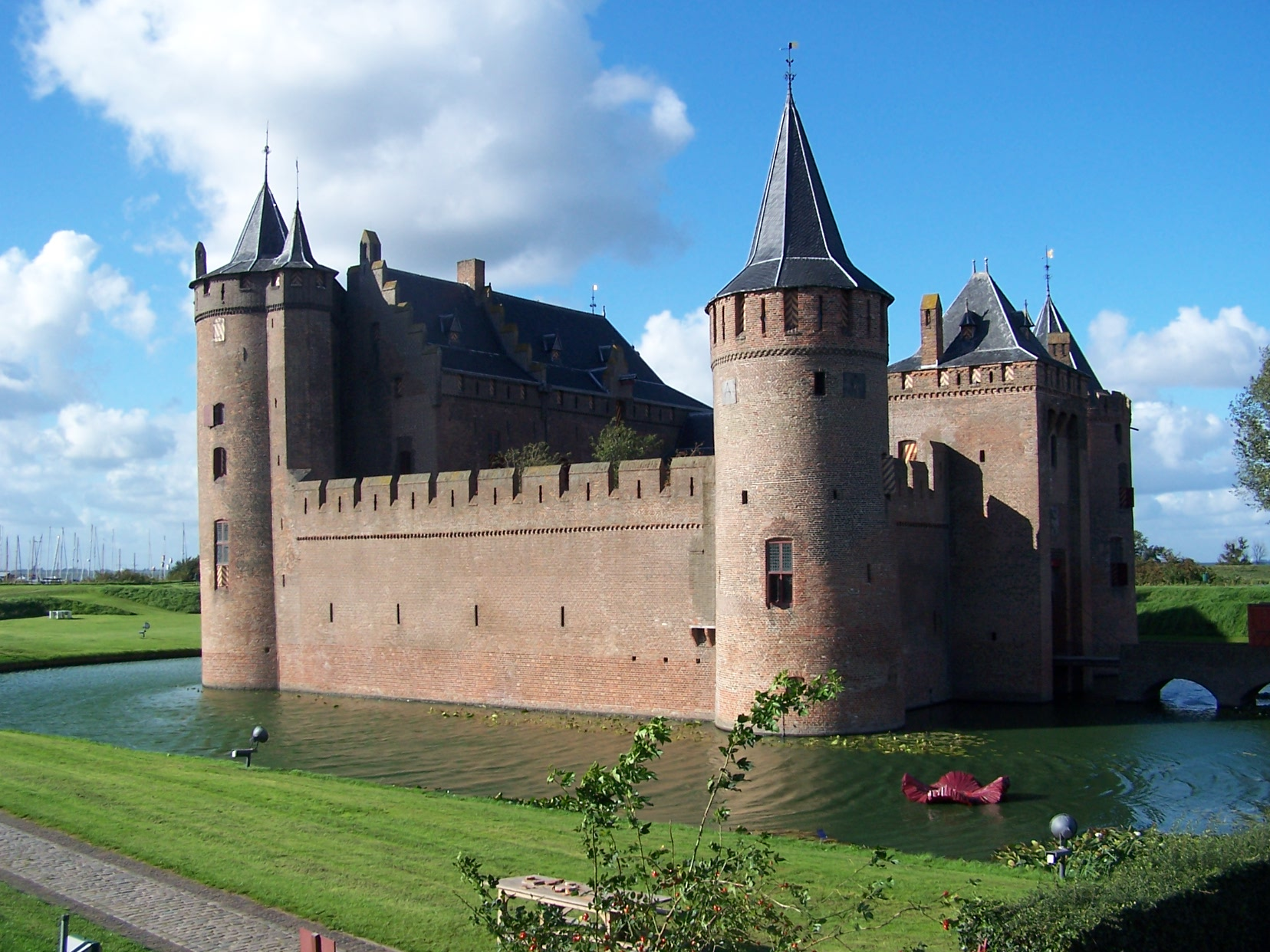
Muiden Castle

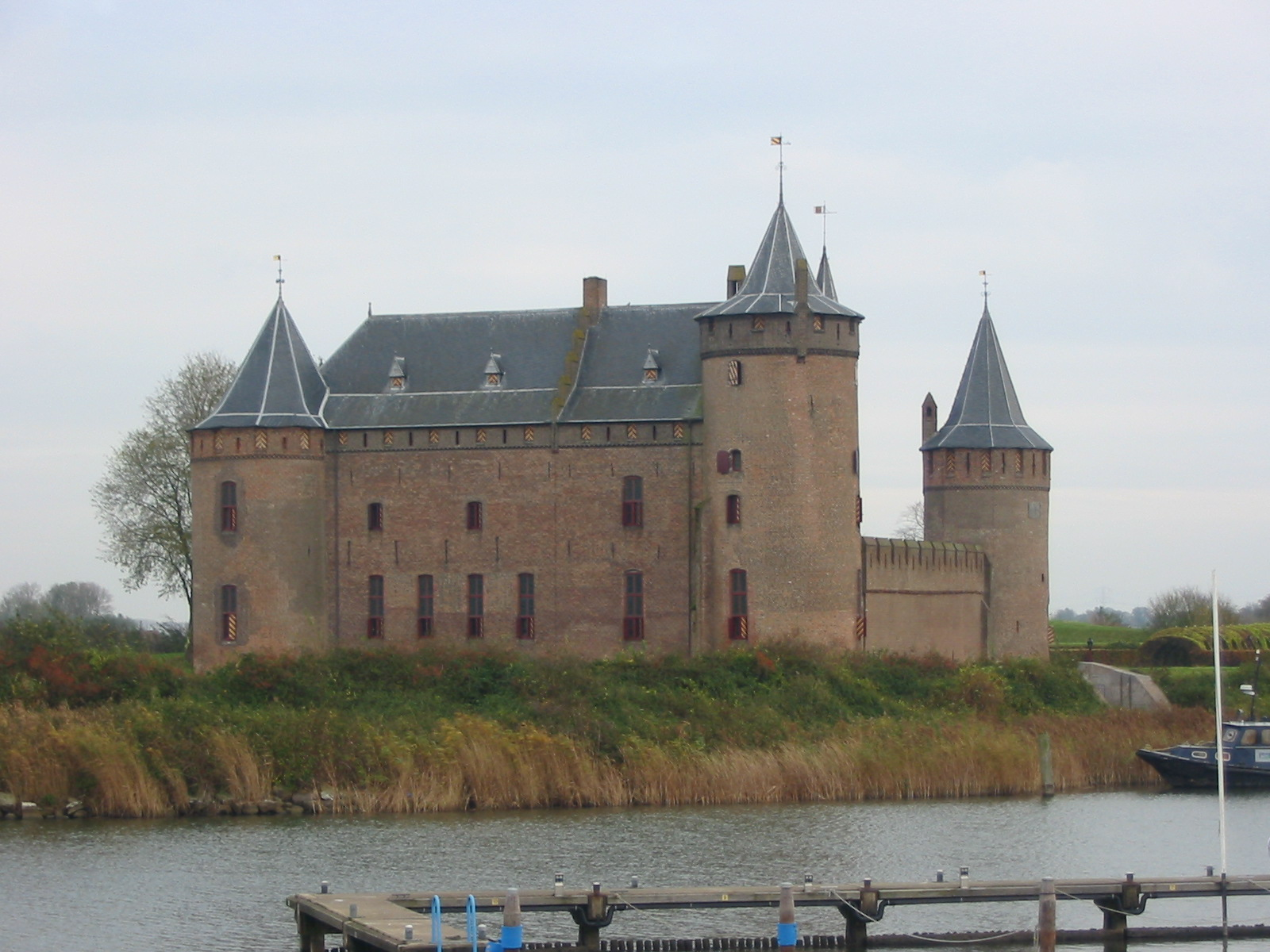
Muiden Castle

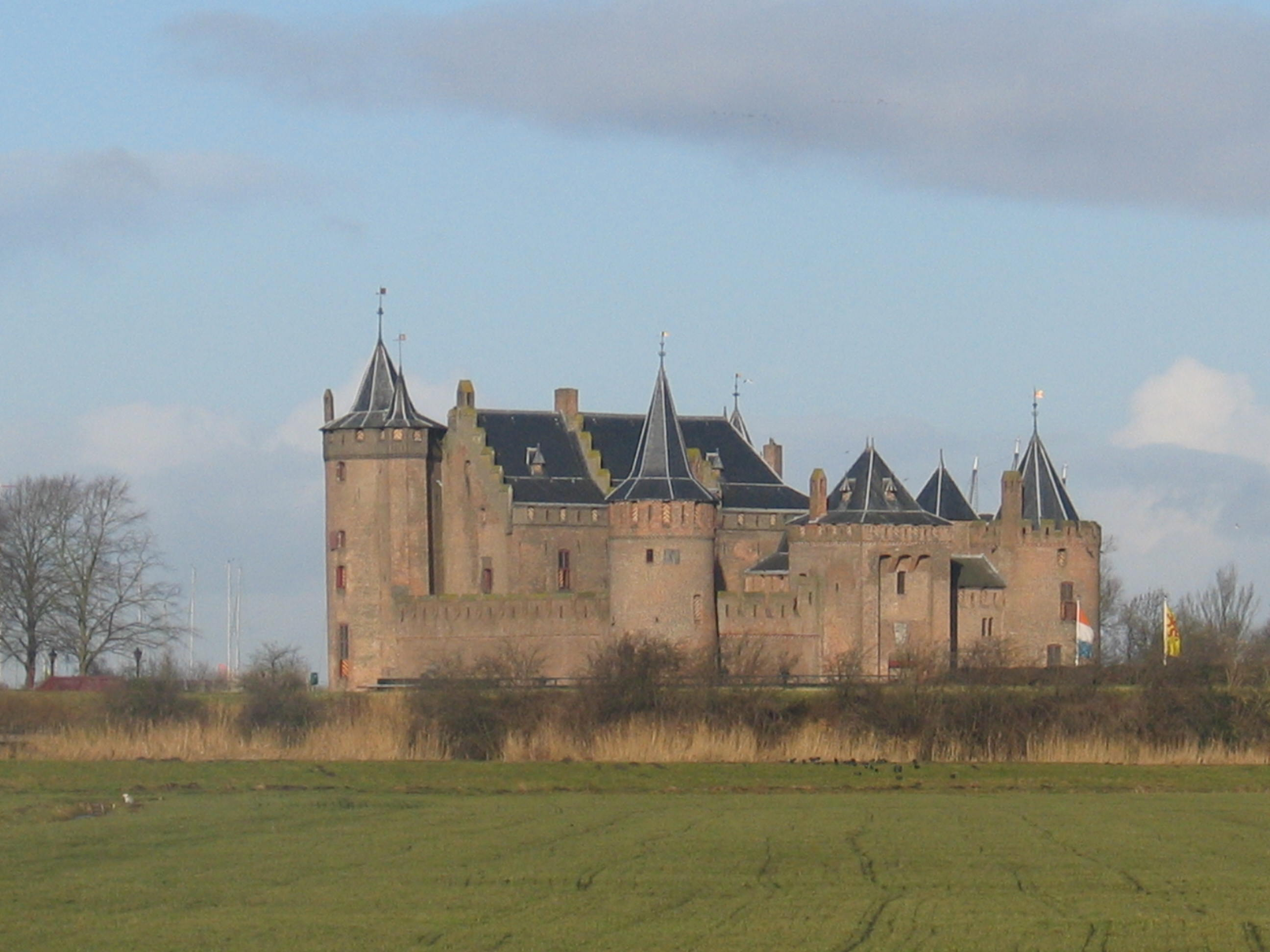
Muiden Castle

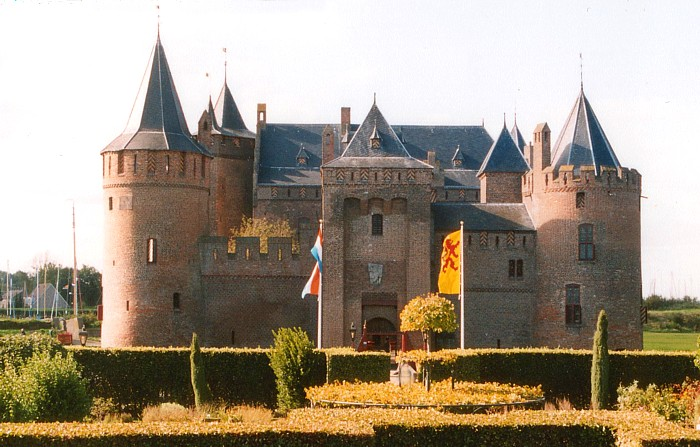
Castle front

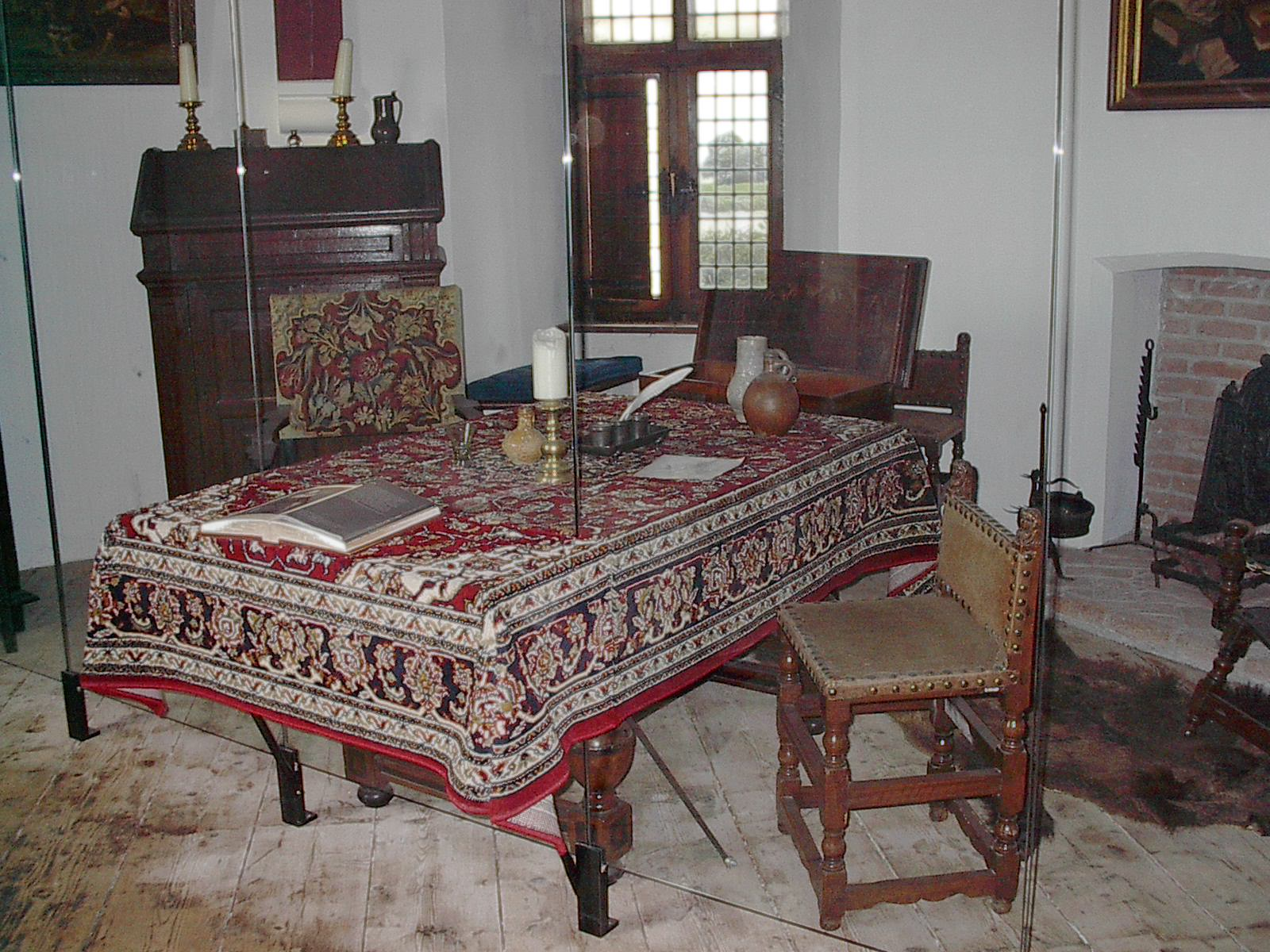
PC Hooft workingroom

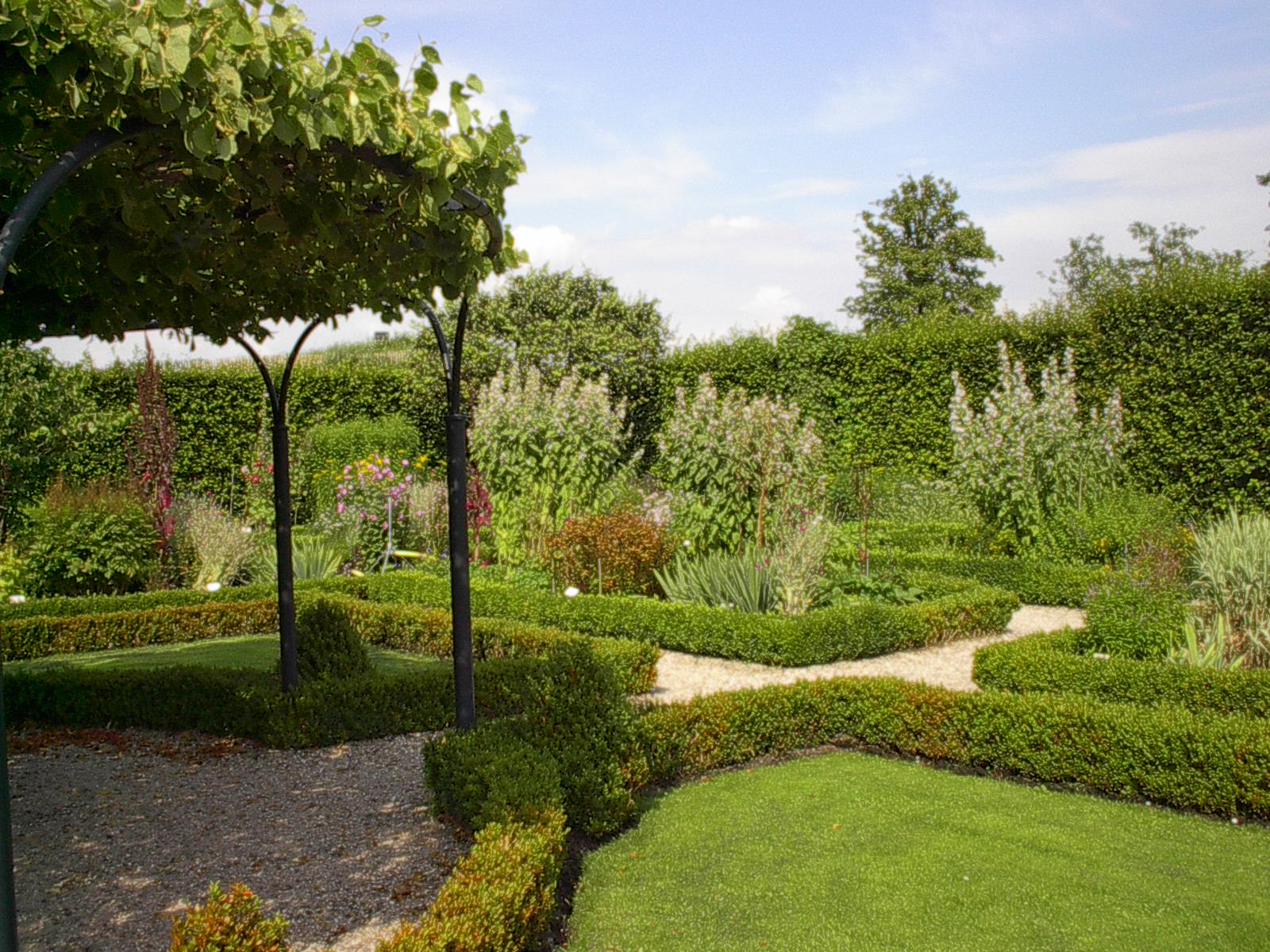
Garden

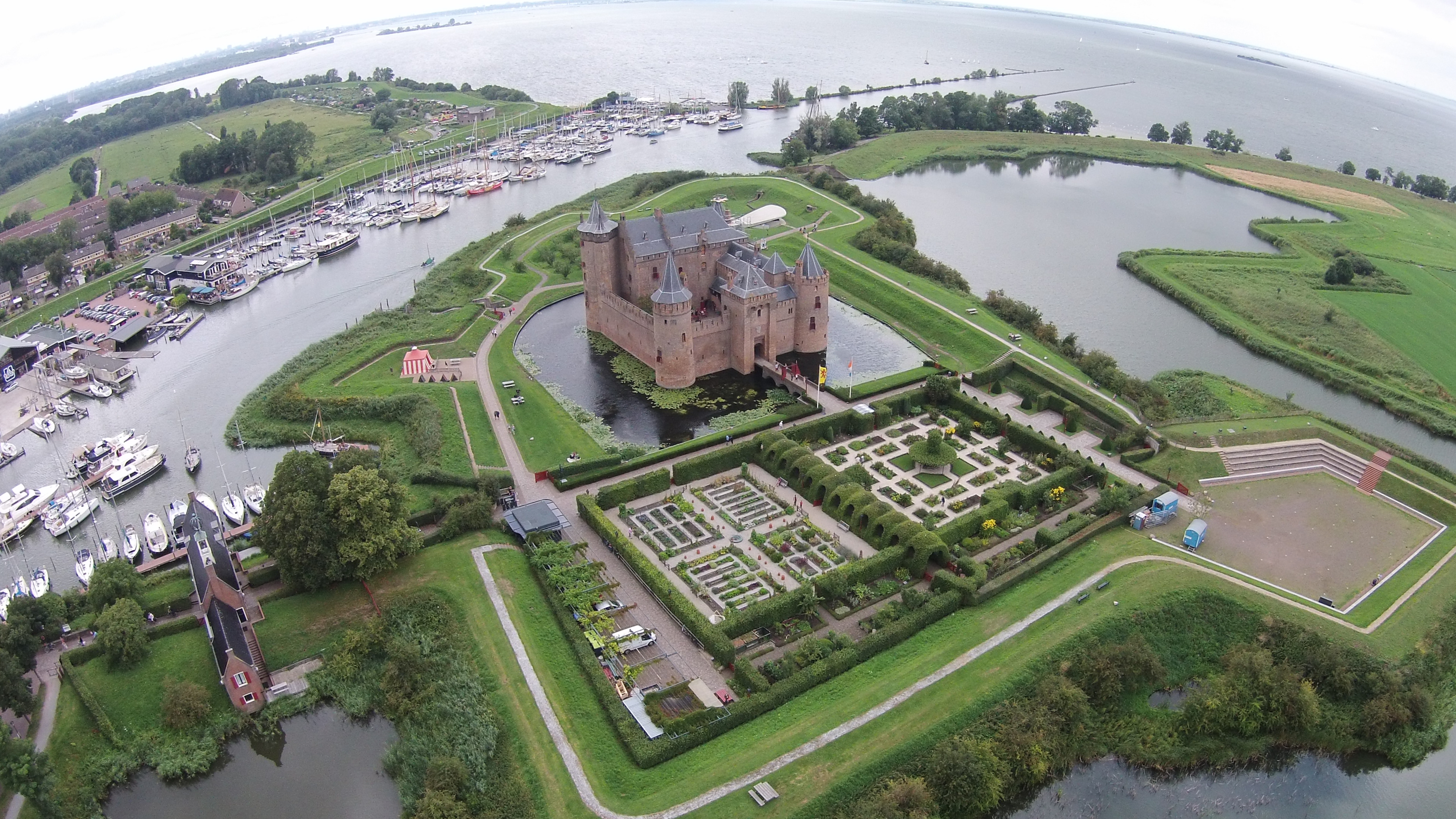
Aerial

== See also ==
- List of castles in the Netherlands
