= Hekelingen =

- Coat of arms
- Interactive map of Hekelingen
- Coordinates: 51°49′36″N 4°20′32″E
- Country: Netherlands
- Province: South Holland
- Municipality: Nissewaard

Area
  - Total: 18.21 km^{2} (7.03 sq mi)

Population (1 January 2025)
  - Total: 1,955

Hekelingen is a village in the Dutch province of South Holland. It is located immediately to the south of Spijkenisse.

From 1812 to 1817, Hekelingen was part of Spijkenisse. It was a separate municipality from 1817 until 1 January 1966, when it merged with Spijkenisse.

The population was 1,955 as of 1 January 2025.
