= Muiderberg =

- Village
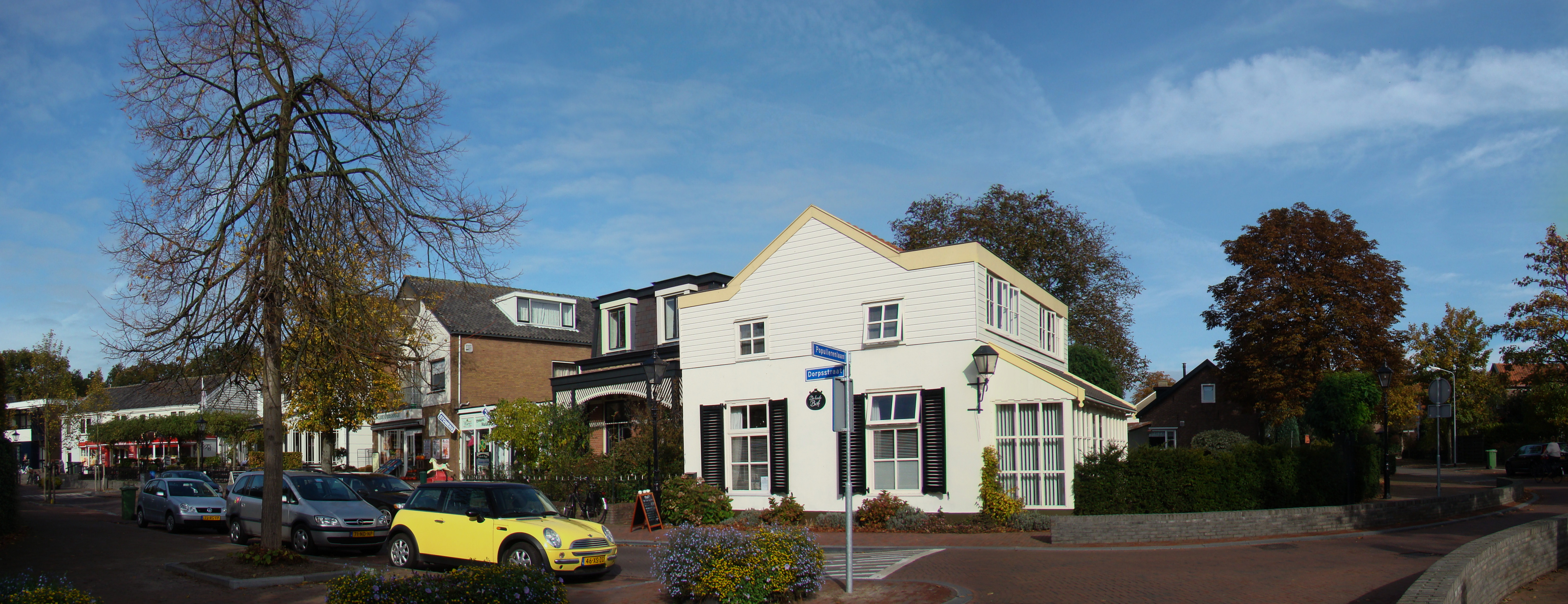
- Dorpsstraat in Muiderberg in 2009

- Flag Coat of arms

- Location in the Netherlands Location in the province of North Holland in the Netherlands
- Coordinates: 52°20′N 5°7′E
- Country: Netherlands
- Province: North Holland
- Municipality: Gooise Meren

Area
  - Total: 1.67 km^{2} (0.64 sq mi)
- Elevation: 0.1 m (0.33 ft)

Population (2021)
  - Total: 2,985
  - Density: 1,790/km^{2} (4,630/sq mi)
- Time zone: UTC+1 (CET)
  - Summer (DST): UTC+2 (CEST)
- Postal code: 1399
- Dialing code: 0294

Muiderberg (Dutch pronunciation: [ˌmœydərˈbɛr(ə)x]) is a village in the municipality of Gooise Meren in the Netherlands. It lies about 6 km north of Bussum and 2 km west of Naarden, adjacent to the Naarderbos.

== Geography ==
Muiderberg is in the east of the municipality of Muiden in the southeast of the province of North Holland in the west of Netherlands. It is situated on the border of the IJmeer to the north and the Naarderbos to the east. It lies about 6 km north of Bussum and 2 km west of Naarden.

== Demography ==
In 2016 the village of Muiderberg had 1605 inhabitants. The built-up area of the town was 0.61 km^{2}, and contained 750 residences. The statistical area "Muiderberg", which also can include the peripheral parts of the village, as well as the surrounding countryside, has a population of around 3140.

== Jewish cemetery ==
Muiderberg also has the largest Jewish cemetery in the Netherlands. The cemetery was founded in 1642 by German Jews and merged with the adjacent Polish Jewish cemetery founded in 1660. The reception area dating from 1933. They were designed by Harry Elte.

== Notable residents ==
- Sjaak Swart (born 1938), Ajax and national team footballer

== Gallery ==
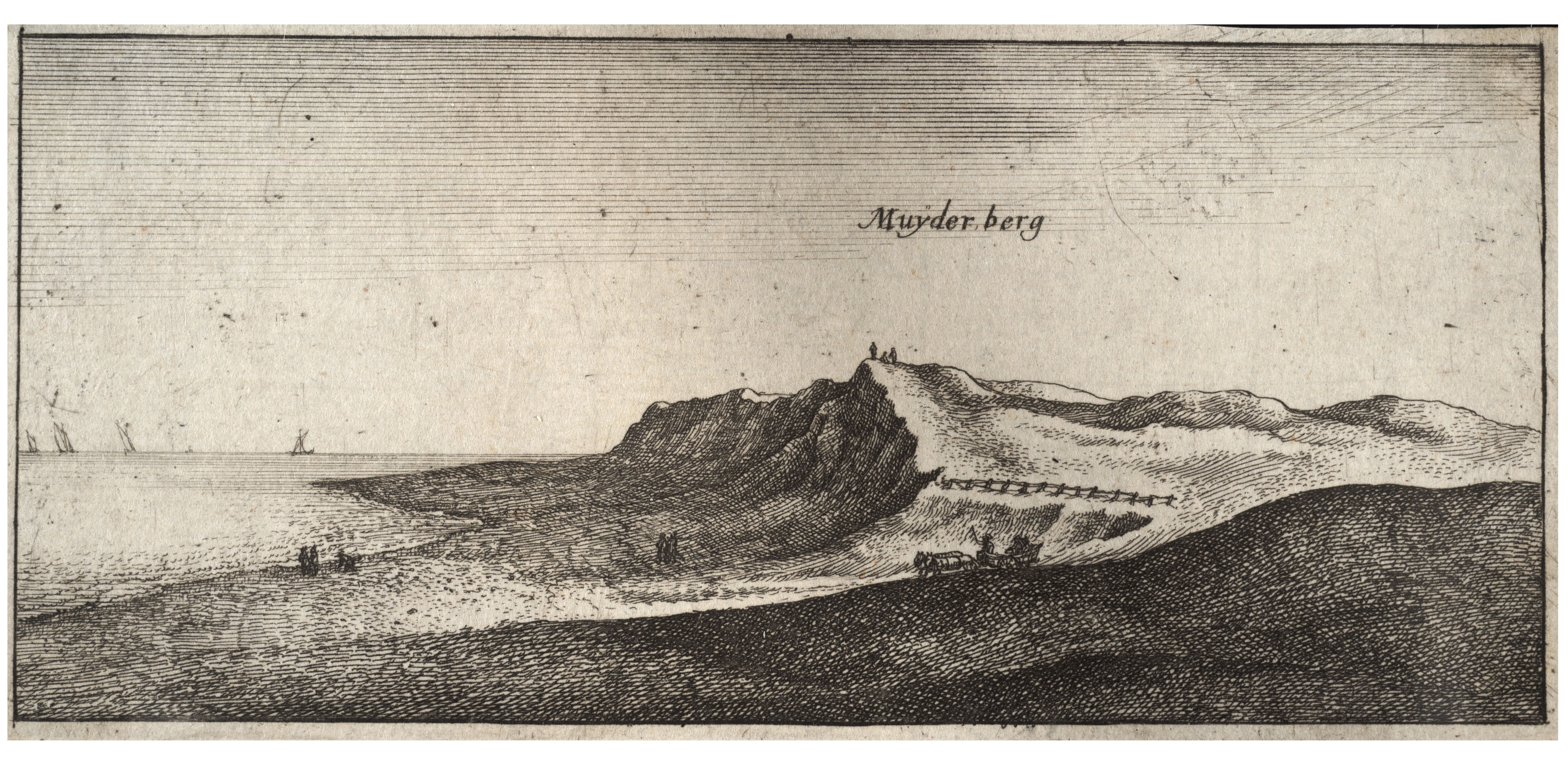
A 17th-century engraving of Muiderberg by Wenceslas Hollar

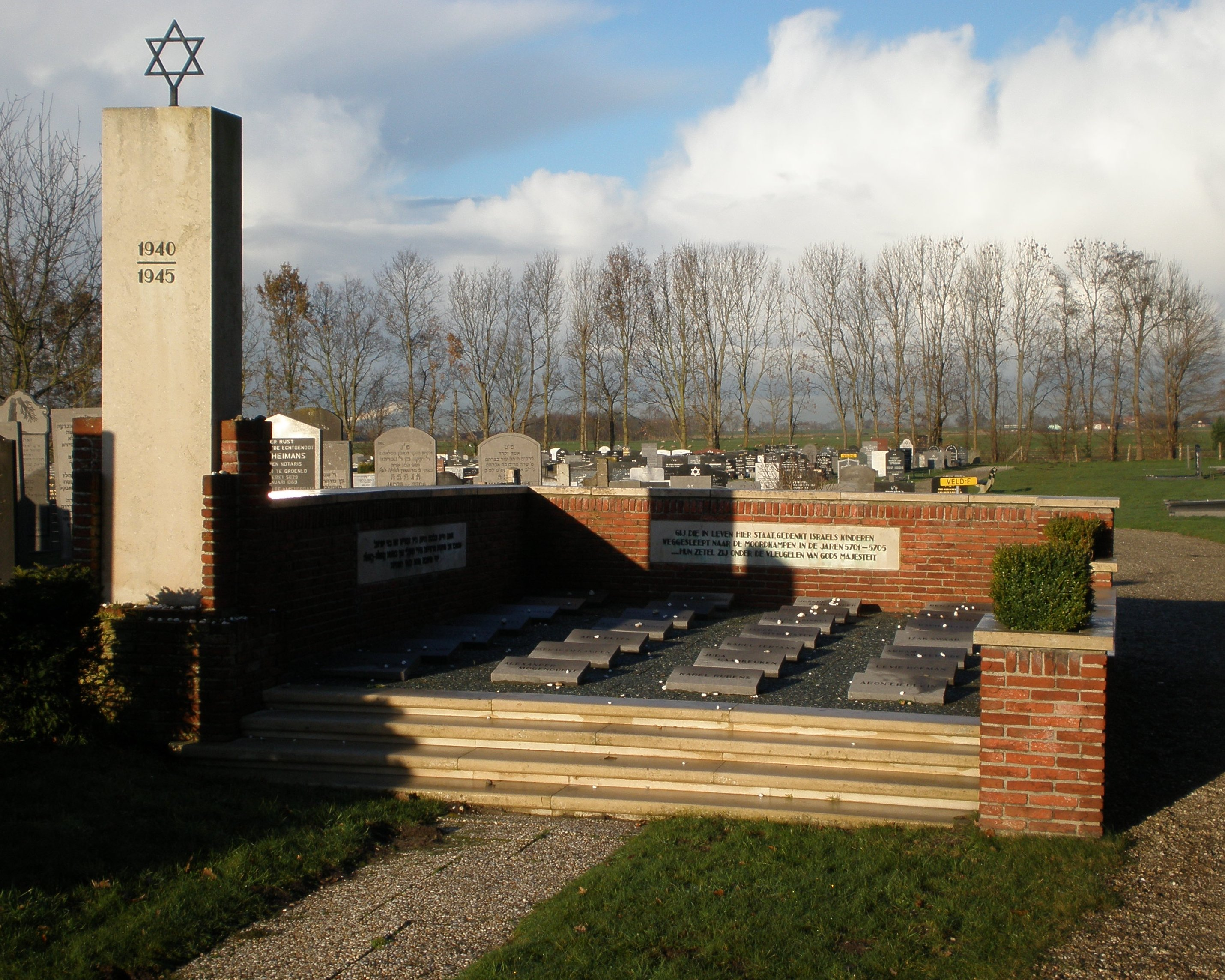
Jewish cemetery Memorial in Muiderberg

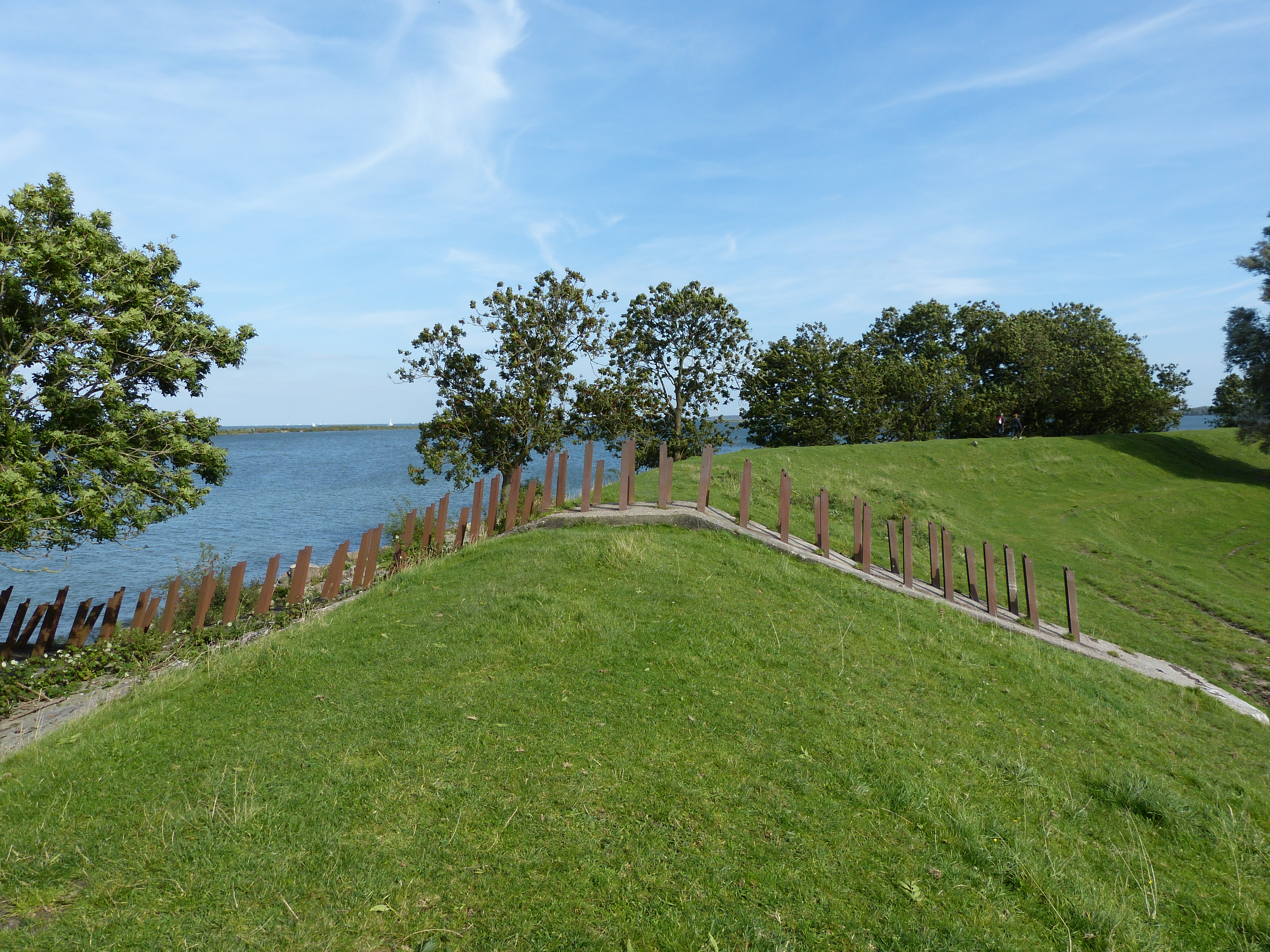
Muiderberg, anti-tank obstacle

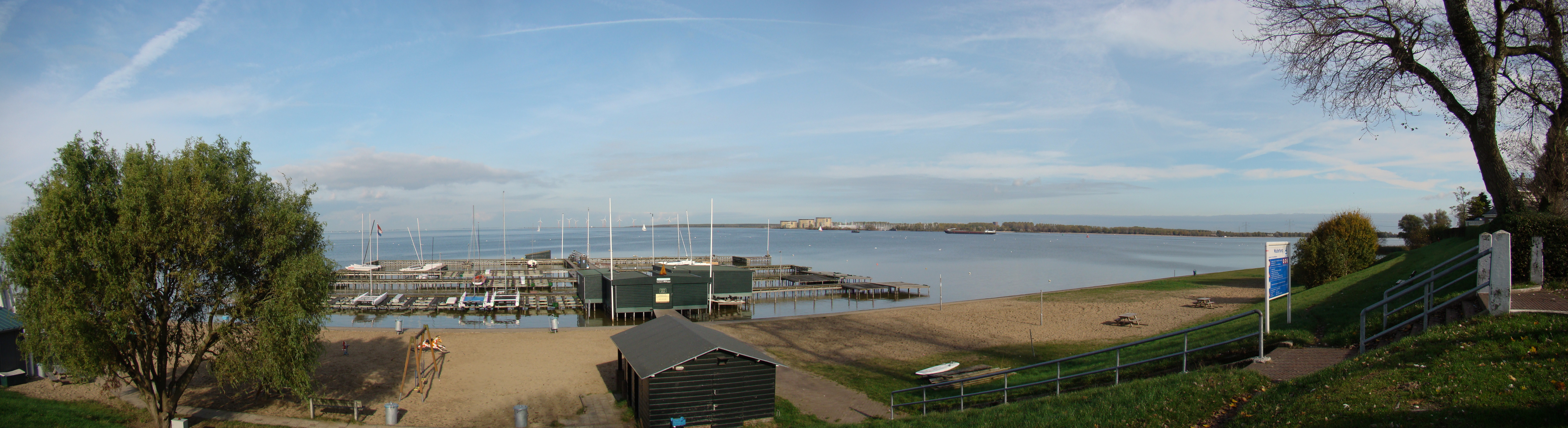
Beach and harbor
