= Siege of Naarden =

Siege of Naarden may refer to:

- Siege of Naarden (1673)
- Siege of Naarden (1813–1814)
