= Massacre of Naarden =

Spanish war crime in the Netherlands

Coordinates: 52.295278°N 5.162222°E

- Part of Eighty Years' War
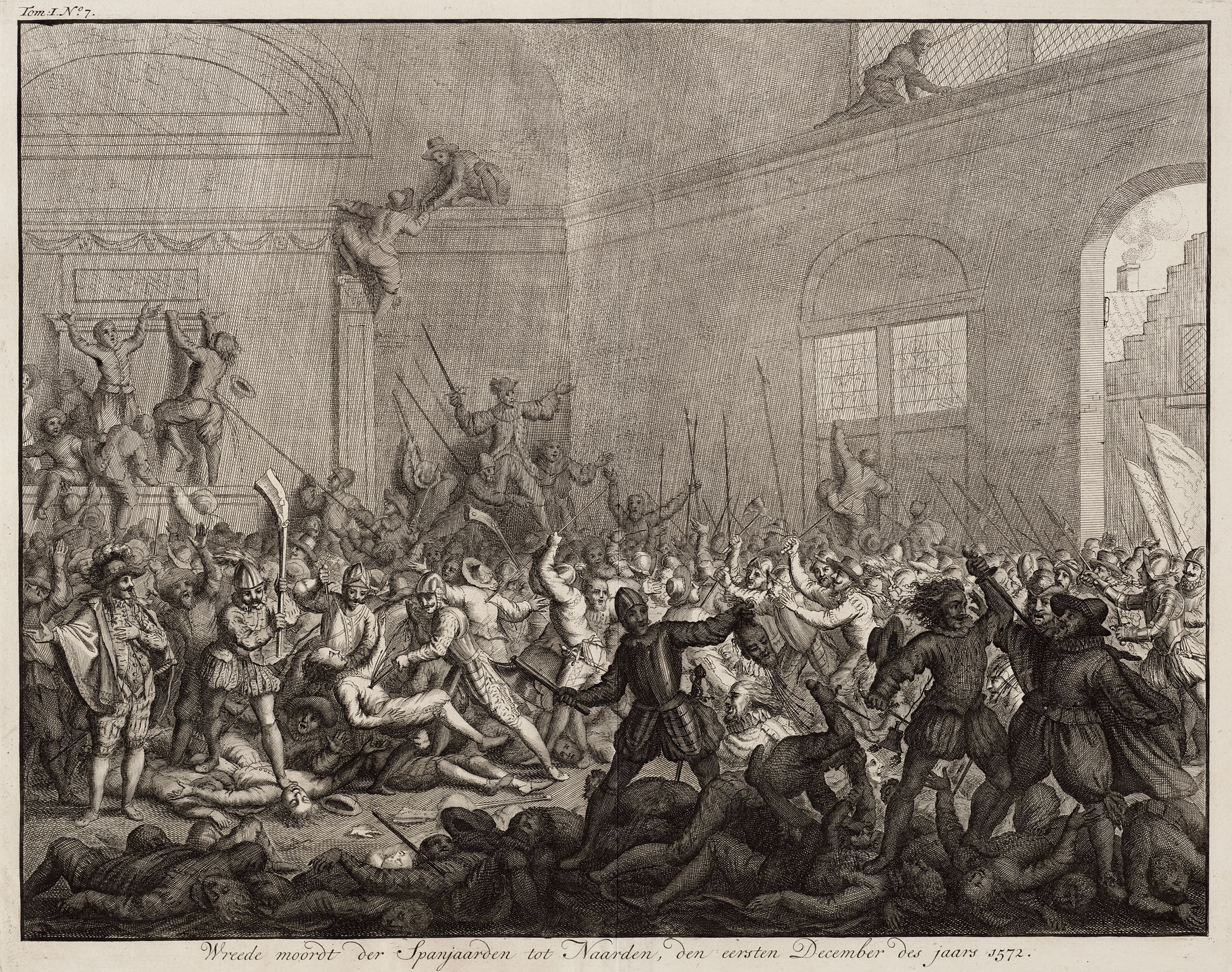
- 17th century print depicting Spanish soldiers massacring the townspeople of Naarden
Date	1 December 1572
Location	Naarden, Netherlands
Result	Near-complete destruction of Naarden

Belligerents
Spain	People of Naarden

Commanders and leaders
(Spain) Fadrique Álvarez de Toledo	None

Casualties and losses
	3,000 people burnt to death

The Massacre of Naarden was an episode of mass murder and looting that took place in the Dutch city of Naarden on 1 December 1572, during the Eighty Years' War. The massacre was committed by Spanish soldiers under the command of Fadrique Álvarez de Toledo against the townspeople of Naarden as part of a punitive expedition against Dutch rebels later known as the Spanish Fury. The destruction of the city galvanized the Dutch rebels, leading them to continue the Dutch War of Independence against Spain.

== History ==
=== Background ===
During the Eighty Years' War, William the Silent of the provisional United Provinces led a revolt against the rule of King Philip II of Spain. After years of Spanish military successes in the Southern Netherlands and Flanders, the revolt experienced a resurgence in 1572 when the Spanish were driven out of Brielle by the Dutch rebels. The capture of Brielle resulted in seven predominantly Protestant Dutch states renewing their support for the rebellion against Spain. In response, Philip II ordered Fernando Álvarez de Toledo, the Spanish governor of the Netherlands, to suppress the revived Dutch revolt and restore Spanish authority to the Netherlands.

Álvarez de Toledo planned to re-establish Spanish rule in the Netherlands by capturing revolting cities and by driving out militant Protestants, who had been one of the causes of original revolt. To this end, de Toledo organized a punitive expedition of Spanish soldiers and mercenaries. These soldiers were inconsistently paid, and it is often cited that de Toledo was already happy to pay his army through the looting of towns, and actively encouraged outright massacre and savagery for the sake of demoralizing the Dutch populace. In the fall of 1572, the elder de Toledo ordered his son Fadrique Álvarez de Toledo to capture and make an example of a number of Dutch towns, a campaign which would later be known as the Spanish Fury. On 2 October the Spanish army sacked Mechelen, where soldiers looted the city for three days and killed several hundred townspeople. Mothers and daughters were raped in front of family members and men were tortured and murdered. De Toledo reported to Madrid that "no nail was left in the wall" in Mechelen. The town of Zutphen was attacked soon after, and suffered a similar fate on 14 November.

=== Massacre of Naarden ===
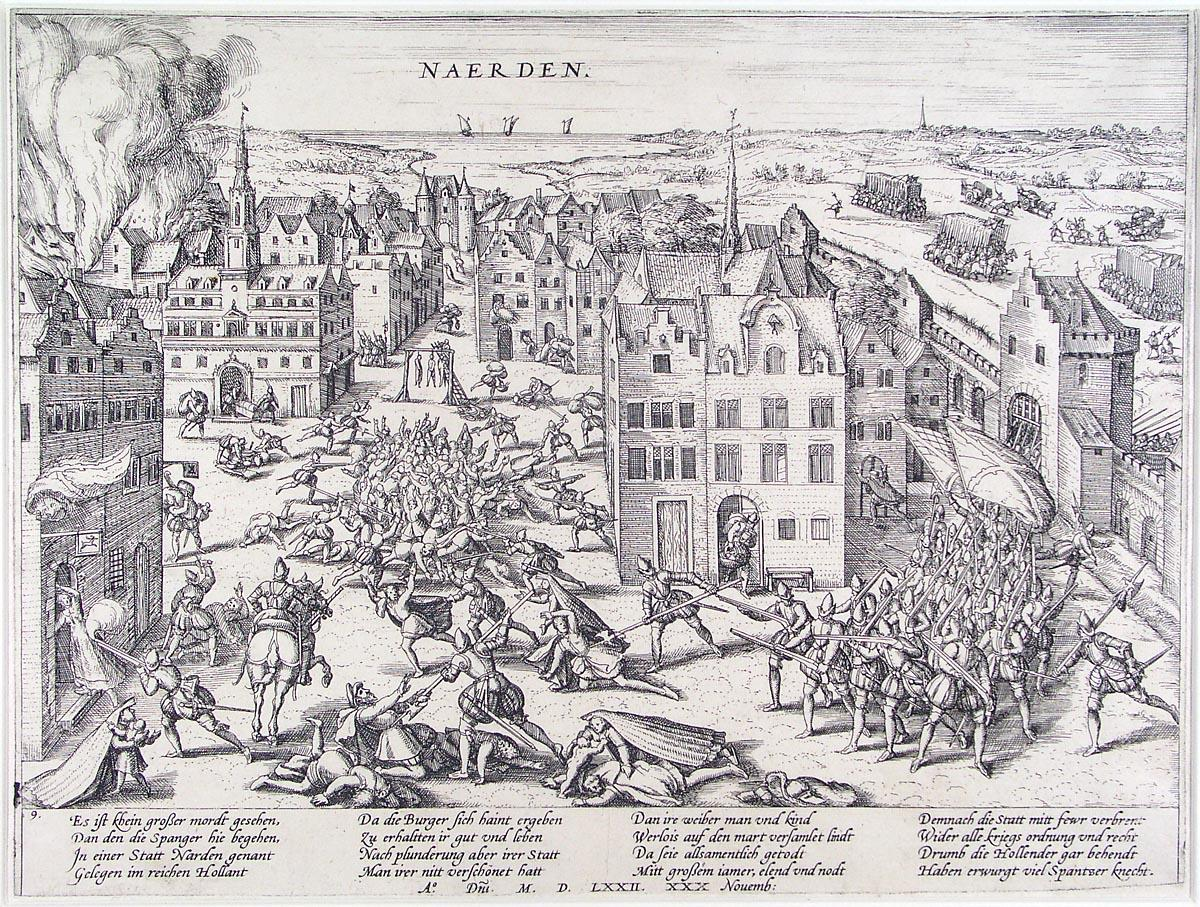
Massacre of Naarden, by Flemish painter Frans Hogenberg

News arrived in Naarden of the fall of Mechelen and Zutphen. The city was unprepared for an assault, and so a delegation of the city's residents began negotiations with the Spanish. It was agreed with Julián Romero that Naarden would open its gates to a small garrison force, surrender supplies to the Spanish, and that every citizen of the city would swear a new oath to the King of Spain. Instead, the Spanish army arrived in its entirety and entered the city on 22 November, taking up positions in the town square. The people of Naarden were forcefully assembled, then led into the town's church and guildhall. The Spanish army then set fire to the buildings and began to sack the town. Several hundred townspeople burned to death, while hundreds more were killed in the square or in their homes. Around 60 of Naarden's over 3,000 inhabitants survived the massacre, with de Toledo stating in a report to King Phillip that "Not a man borne escaped" Naarden. Several days later, the Spanish army conscripted peasants from nearby Gooiland to demolish the remaining buildings in the ruined town.

=== Aftermath ===
Word spread of Naarden's sacking, often by way of the Spanish army itself. Contrary to the intent of the Spanish campaign, the destruction of Naarden became a rallying symbol for the Dutch rebels.
