= Spanish Fury =

1572–1579 looting by Spanish forces during the Dutch Revolt

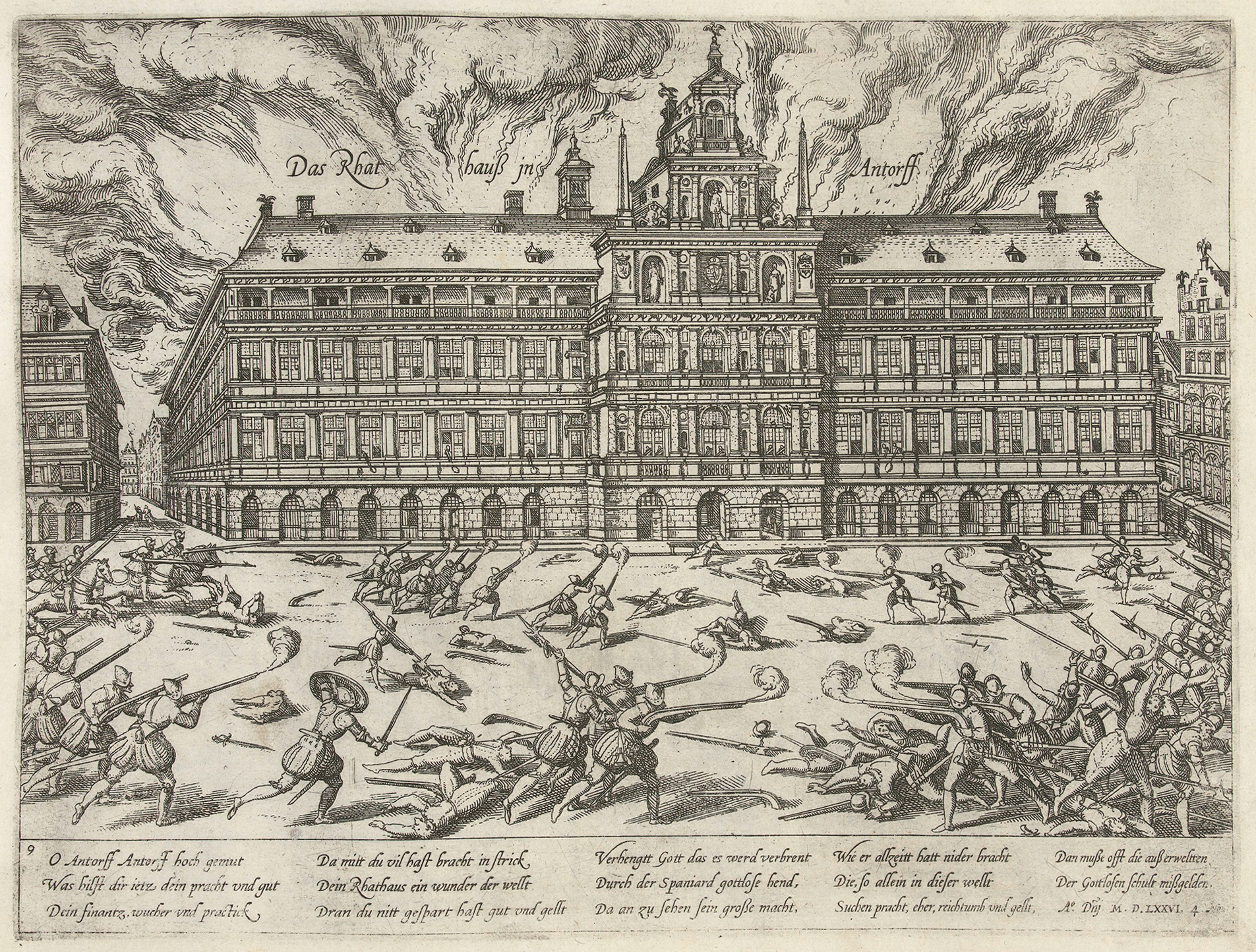
Mutinous troops of the Army of Flanders ransack the Grote Markt during the sack of Antwerp in 1576. Engraving by Frans Hogenberg.

The Spanish Fury (or the Spanish Terror) was a number of violent sackings of cities in the Low Countries or Benelux, mostly by Spanish Habsburg armies, that happened in the years 1572–1579 during the Dutch Revolt. In some cases, the sack did not follow the taking of a city. In others, the sack was ordered, or at least not restrained, by Spanish commanders after the fall of a city.

The most notorious Spanish Fury was the sack of Antwerp in November 1576. In English, this, and the mutinous campaign of 1576 in general, tends to be what is meant by "Spanish Fury". In Dutch, the term includes a wider range of sackings, in particular the city punishments of 1572. The events of the Spanish Fury contributed to the creation of anti-Spanish sentiment in many parts of Europe.

== Background ==
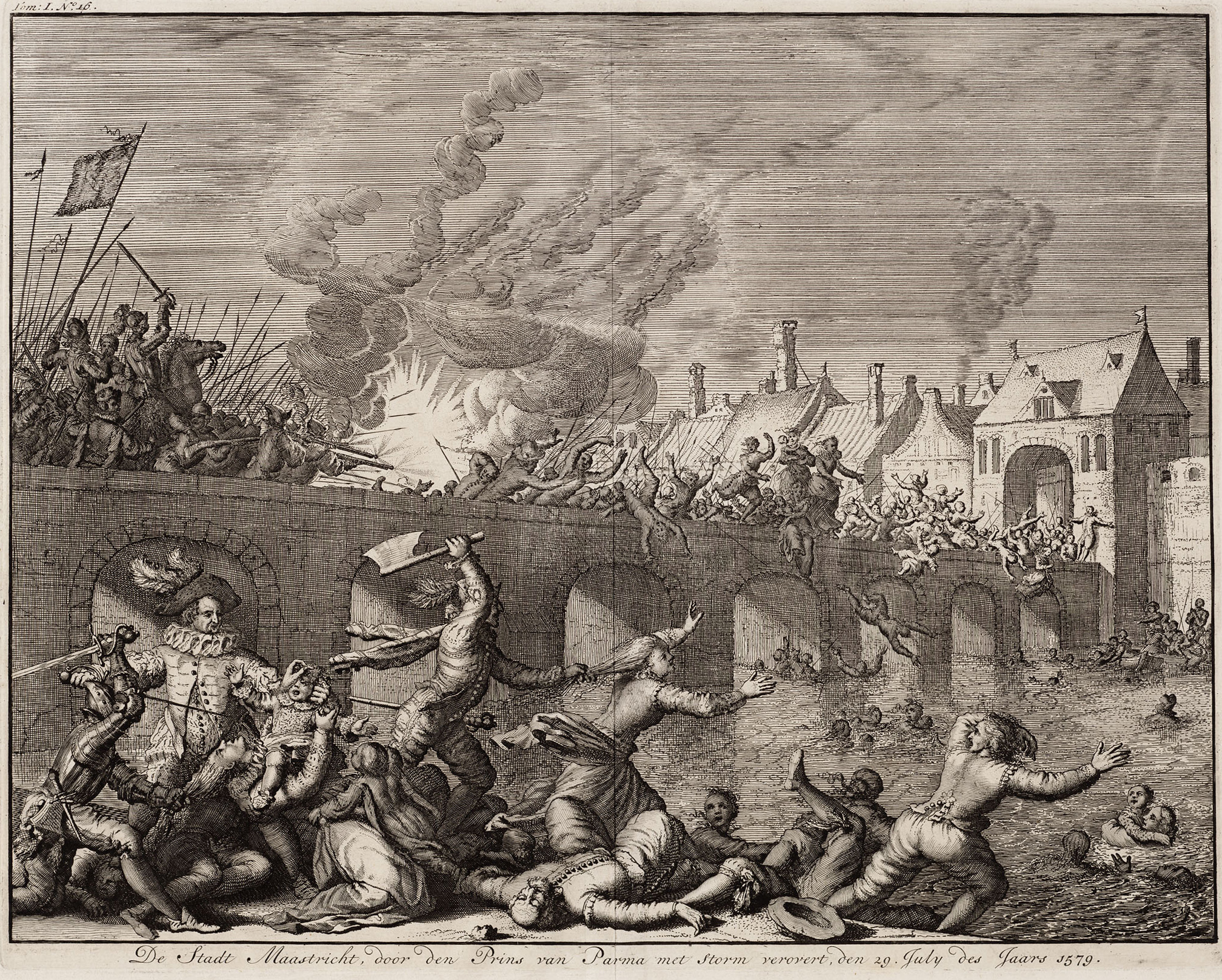
The Spanish Fury of Maastricht in 1579

Several requests were made for relaxation of religious coercion in the Low Countries, including a rejected petition by a covenant of noblemen in the winter of 1565–66. The summer brought renewed violent outbursts of iconoclasm, in which 'Beeldenstorm' Calvinists destroyed religious images in Catholic monasteries and churches. The Battle of Oosterweel in March 1567 was the first Spanish military response to the many riots and a prelude to or the start of the Eighty Years' War. (Note: The 80 Years' War can be seen to have started on 13 March 1567 with the defeat of the rebels at Oosterweel, or eleven days later, when besieged Valenciennes surrendered. The rebels' first victory, in May 1568 at Heiligerlee, is by the Dutch often regarded as the start of the War.) The Spanish King's captain-general Alba, the Iron Duke, with 10,000 men made the first military use of the Spanish Road. He was granted powers exceeding those of the king's half-sister Margaret of Parma, who had maneuvered both Granvelle and William the Silent of Orange to the background while trying to reconcile local priorities with Spanish orders. Upon their meeting, judging the duke's inflexibility on extreme positions, the duchess resigned. He replaced her as governor-general of the Seventeen Provinces and unlawfully instituted the Council of Troubles in September of that same year. This court-martial style tribunal often sentenced political opponents and religious Reformists to death; the more than 1,000 executions caused it to be called the 'Council of Blood'.

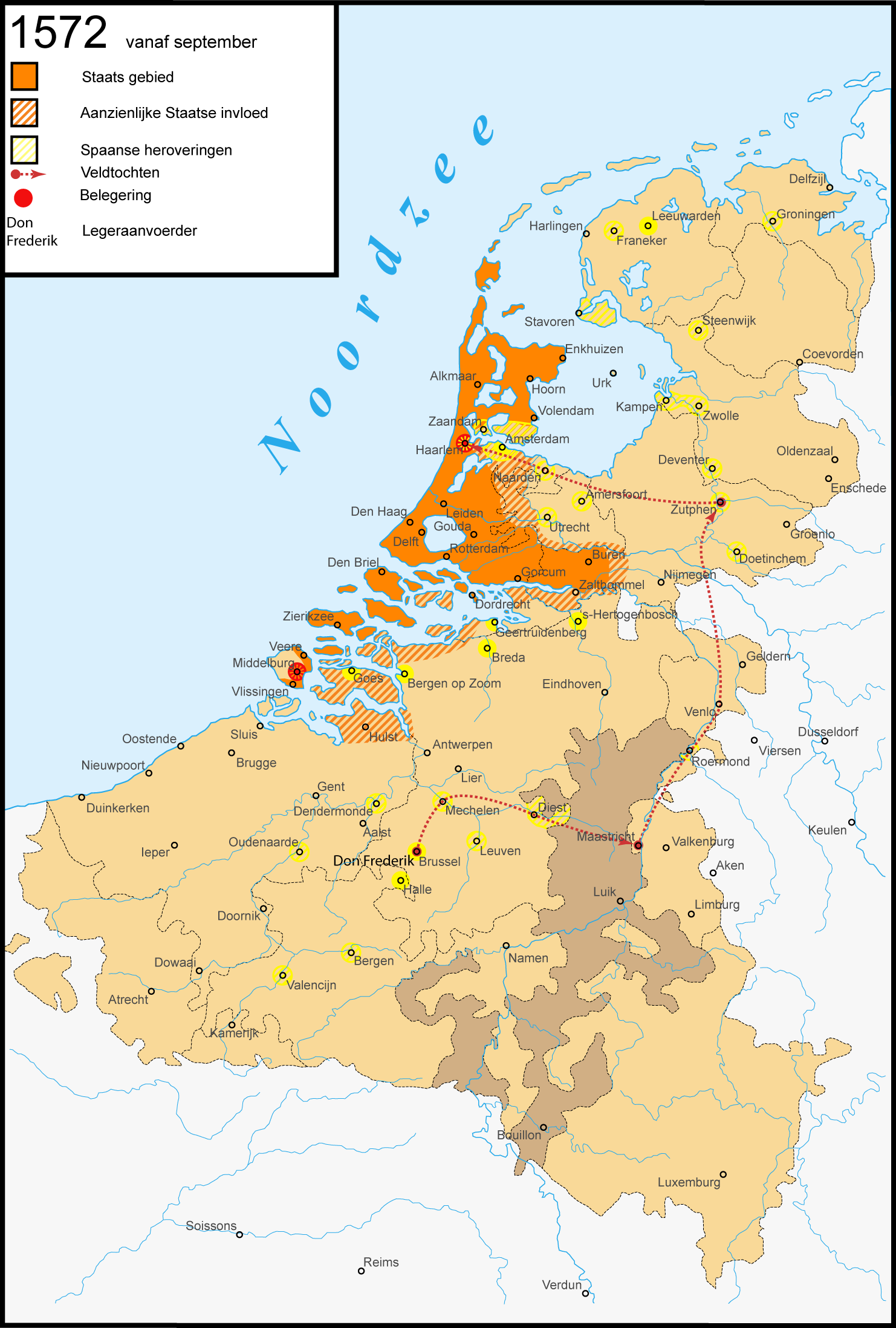
Don Fadrique's deployment of the Army of Flanders, 1572

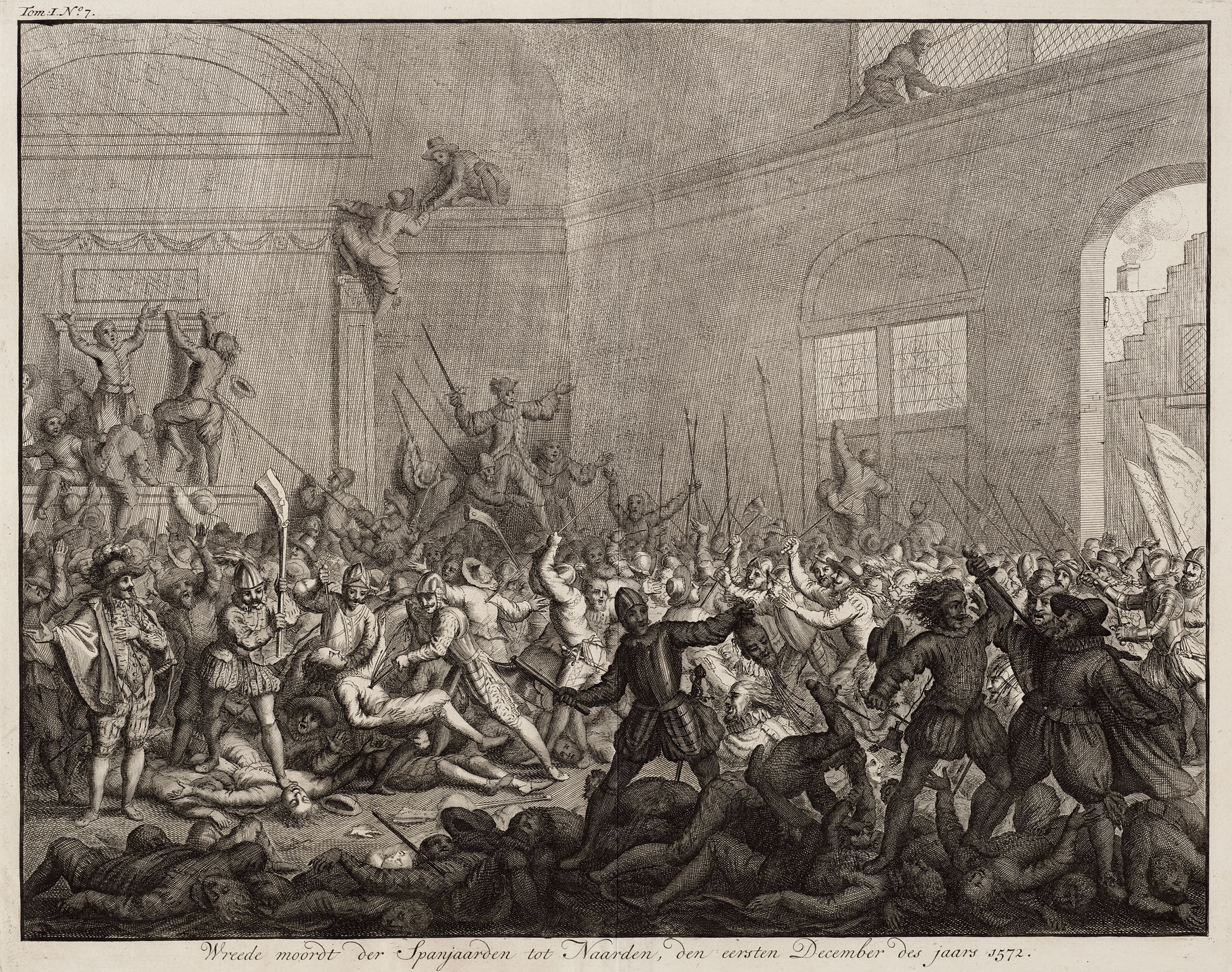
Massacre of Naarden, 1 December 1572, Spanish soldiers slaughtering local civilians (17th century etching by J. Luyken) British Museum, London

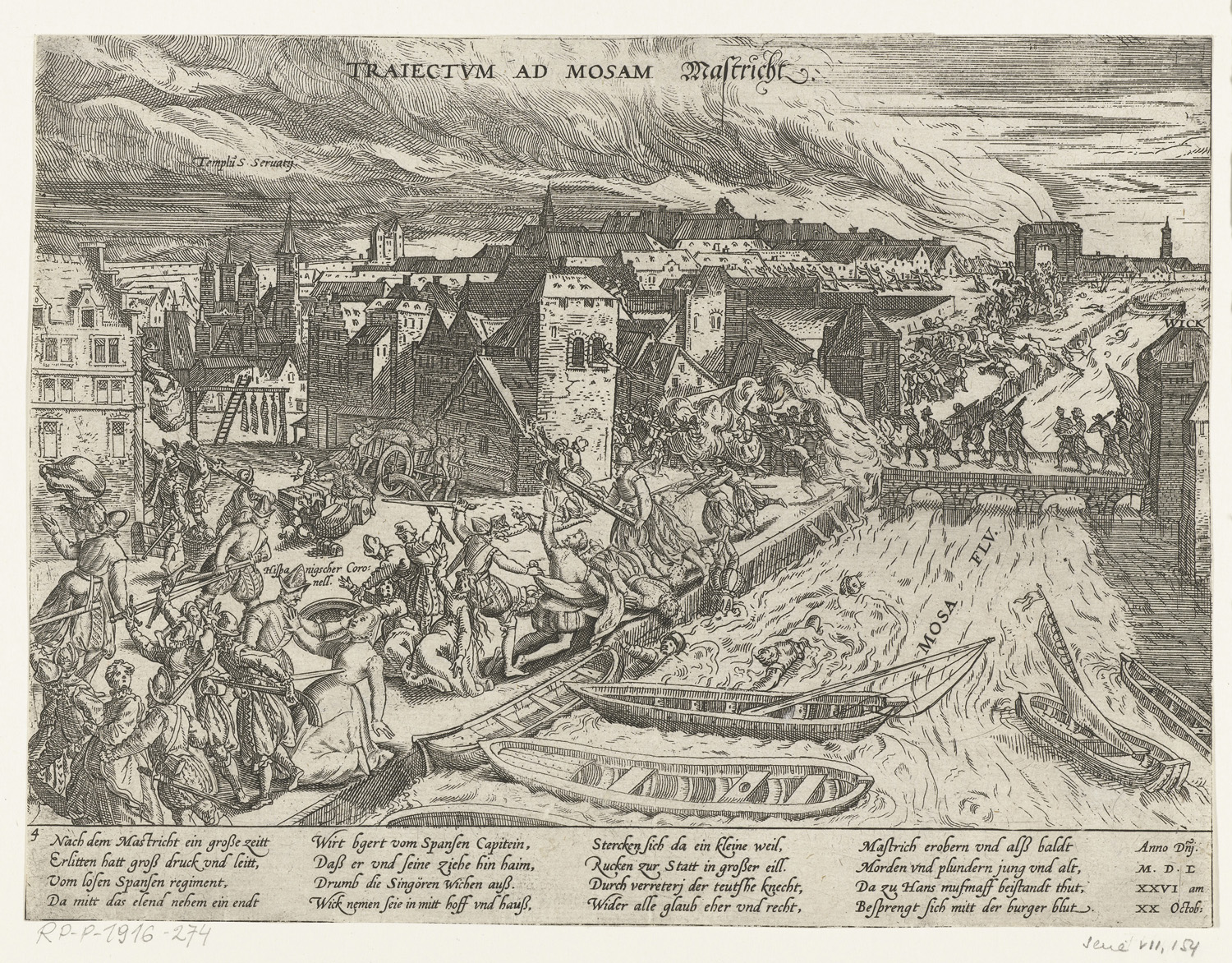
The pillaging of Maastricht in 1576

The Sea Beggars, having been driven out of English harbours by Elizabeth I, captured Brielle on 1 April 1572. This foothold triggered an anti-royalist rebellion in the Counties of Zeeland and of Holland. Other cities in the Low Countries that showed signs of rebellion against the increased taxation and prosecution of Protestants, or did not allow troops of either side in, became vigorously forced into Catholicism and total political obedience to the Spanish Crown.

== Spanish Furies ==
=== By underpaid military under the regular command ===
Looting a conquered town was not uncommon, and Governor Alba took it a step further by intentionally setting horrifying examples against sympathy for the rebels.

- The Spanish Fury at Mechelen was the earliest event known by this term. After Orange's lieutenant Bernard of Merode had taken and controlled the city of Mechelen for a month, he and his men left because a much stronger Spanish force was coming. Despite welcoming the latter by singing psalms of penitence in a gesture of surrender, from 2 October 1572, under command of Governor Alva's (Note: The Dukes of Alba that played an active role in the 16th century Netherlands, Fernando and Fadrique Álvarez de Toledo, are in the Low Countries, in their present language still, referred to as 'Alva'. Though the usual short name is 'Alba' in English, the Dutch one is occasionally borrowed for English language texts, e.g. chapter "Alva's Throne: Making Sense of the Revolt of the Netherlands" by Henk van Nierop in Graham Darby's The Origins and Development of the Dutch Revolt.) son Fadrique, during three days the city was sacked by his slaughtering, raping and pillaging troops. Alva reported to King Philip II that "no nail was left in the wall".
- The Army of Flanders that sacked Mechelen reconquered Diest and Roermond, marched on to Guelders, and in November easily regained Zutphen, which had been taken for Orange in June. Don Fadrique ordered his men to kill the garrison and allowed them to murder and plunder the city. After the Spanish Fury at Zutphen, the counties to its north capitulated.
- By December at Naarden, Holland, the inhabitants negotiated their surrender but the city was sacked and burnt down, and only 60 people survived the Massacre of Naarden.
- The Spanish Fury at Haarlem, in 1573, following the half-year-long Siege of Haarlem

By December 1573, high yet ineffective financial expenditures and complaints about the sheer cruelty of the governor's expeditions led Philip II to Requesens, where he replaced Alba, who returned to Spain. The notorious 'Council of Blood' ordered no more executions, and was officially abolished in June 1574 by Requesens, but remained in session until summer of 1576.

In October 1576, during the city of Maastricht's rebellion against its fortress because of continued heavy payments, German soldiers of the Spanish garrison followed city council's orders and stood aside. While some Spanish troops held out at one of the gates, others fled with the garrison's commander Francisco de Montesdoca to captain Martín de Ayala's minor fortification at Wyck just across the River Maas bridge. Though Montesdoca was offered safety during negotiations, he was arrested in the heat of this dispute. He was liberated while soldiery arriving from Dalem and those of Wyck captured the city. As few Spanish lives had been lost, the Germans were excused but had to make camp in neighbouring villages.

- The Spanish Fury of October 1576 refers to the subsequent punishment of the city with a pillaging bloodbath.

=== By abandoned military on looting expedition ===
Upon Requesens' death in March 1576, the Spanish king appointed his own half-brother Don Juan as Governor-General of the Netherlands but hesitated several months before notifying him. Even then, Don Juan did not hurry to proceed to the Netherlands. The abandoned officers and ordinary soldiers were not being paid and started a mutinous looting campaign.

- The Spanish Fury at Aalst, a city that had always been loyal, showed that the military insurgencies that had occurred more than occasionally since 1573, had totally run out of hand by July 1576. Rampant soldiers sacked about 170 places in Brabant.
- The Spanish Fury at Antwerp, the most famous event by this name, also known as the Sack of Antwerp, occurred when the forces coming from Aalst and those from Maastricht met in November 1576. A thousand buildings were torched and as many as 17,000 men, women, and children were killed.

==== Aftermath ====
The Pacification of Ghent by which both Calvinists and Catholics decided to expel all Spanish troops, and for which negotiations had been going on since the sack of Aalst, was signed a few days after Antwerp's fate. It was acceded to on 12 February 1577 by governor-general Don Juan when he signed the Perpetual Edict. A few months later, despite the agreed terms, Don Juan began planning a new campaign against the Dutch rebels, who found an ally in England's Elizabeth I. (Note: Queen Mary I of England had married King Philip II of Spain to ensure continued reimposing of Catholicism on England: an heir would have prevented her Protestant half-sister Elisabeth's succession to the throne. The latter had been imprisoned by Mary in the aftermath of Wyatt's rebellion. On 29 July 1554 Philip wrote to a correspondent in Brussels, "the marriage was concluded for no fleshly consideration, but to remedy the disorders of this kingdom and to preserve the Low Countries." (Porter, Linda (2007). Mary Tudor: The First Queen. pp. 464. Piatkus Books Ltd, London, UK, 2009. ISBN 978-0-7499-0982-6. p. 320) In 1558, 'Bloody Mary' had died without such heir, de facto having kept the throne of a country in crisis warm for Elizabeth.) Though never recognized by Philip, an arrangement by Catholics put his nephew Matthias of Austria, Duke of Burgundy and Brabant, in the position of governor of the Netherlands until 1581. (Note: Philip II would much later appoint another son of his sister Maria and Emperor Maximilian II, Matthias' brother Ernest as governor-general of the Spanish Netherlands.)

=== By uncontrolled victorious military ===
Alexander Farnese, son of Margaret of Parma, reconquered a large part of the Netherlands by methods found honourable by friend and foe. Thereupon the Union of Arras was signed and only weeks later, on 23 January 1579, the Union of Utrecht, at which the separation between southern and northern Netherlands became a fact. However, the war was not finished.

Between 12 March and 1 July 1579, both sides suffered hard in the siege of Maastricht. (Note: Maastricht was besieged at many other occasions, e.g. it withstood a siege by troops of Liège and Loon in 1407–1408, lost the city's siege of 1673 during the Franco-Dutch War, and the siege of its barrier fortress, in 1748, by the end of the War of the Austrian Succession.) The victorious attackers then held a second Spanish Fury at Maastricht which killed all but 400 people out of a population of 30,000.

== See also ==
- A Larum for London, a 1602 play based on the Spanish Fury.
- Letters from the Segovia Woods
- Martyrs of Gorkum
