= A Larum for London =

A Larum for London, or the Siedge of Antwerp is a play written by an anonymous author, published in London in 1602. It provides a graphic re-enactment of the sack of Antwerp by Spanish troops in 1576, sometimes called the Spanish Fury. Not widely printed at the time of its release and virtually unknown today, A Larum for London inspired the historian William S. Maltby to remark that "not all Elizabethan playwrights were touched with genius."

== Content ==
The play begins with righteous depictions of Spanish officers plotting and city authorities fruitlessly debating peace or war, but quickly dissolves into a hodge-podge of unconnected rapes, murders and extortions. Most of the lines in the piece are assigned to its large assortment of villains, including the Spanish commander "Sancto Danila", the treacherous Van End, colonel of the turncoat German mercenary garrison, and, inexplicably, the Duke of Alva, who in fact was far away in Spain during the massacre. For a hero, the play has only a one-legged Flemish soldier known as Stump, who performs random acts of gallantry throughout the action, despite having been mistreated by the civil authorities of Antwerp before the attack. As for the victims of the massacre, Englishmen feature prominently among the most ill-treated: one trader is compelled under torture to relinquish all his wealth to Danila, only to be further tortured and killed by two other Spanish officers when he explains that he has nothing left to give them. Many of the city's women and children suffer equally pitiable fates, but the men of Antwerp are not so sympathetic. The governor and burghers of the city are repeatedly portrayed as fat, miserly, cowardly and bereft of foresight, and their decisions neither to join with the Prince of Orange nor to build a larger defence force of their own are shown to be instrumental in facilitating their city's downfall.

== Political messages ==
The message of the story is seemingly as uncomplicated as its plot. The city authorities reap the dire consequences of their parsimony in military matters and their waffling approach to alliances, while the city as a whole draws divine punishment for the pride and worldliness of the "swilling Epicures" dwelling within it. Indeed, the figure of the burgher is depicted as something of a microcosm of the city as a whole: blinded by avarice and spoiled by luxury, he is easy prey for the hard, cruel Spaniards. Just as the city is described by the Spaniards as a woman to be won – "She must be courted... her self invites, / And beckons us unto her sportfull bed" – so are the burghers themselves characterized in feminine terms: they have bodies "us’d to soft effeminate silkes" and minds "set all on dalliance", while "Cankering rust devours [their] emptie Cannons", the only symbols of masculine power associated with them. Much more than in George Gascoigne's account, the burghers and civil authorities seem to serve as examples of how not to lead one’s life, just as Antwerp itself is intended as "a mean all cities to affright."

The play's characterization of the Spanish is more complex. The author is at pains to stage maximally cruel scenarios, with girls subjected to rape and murder, citizens tortured for their money, and blind old fathers slaughtered together with their infant children. Most of the atrocities are committed not by the common soldiery, whose delinquency was the focus of Gascoigne's account, but rather by the top brass of the Spanish army, who steal and kill liberally with their own hands. Whether this is a concession to dramatic norms or an effort to implicate the entire Spanish administration is difficult to say, though the unhistorical inclusion of the arch-villain Duke of Alva suggests that the playwright was trying to link the sack of Antwerp to the earlier iniquities of the Duke's own governorship, perhaps to create a sense of the continuity of Spanish villainy. In any case, the result is to portray the Spanish Fury not as the savage initiative of mutinous soldiers, the image presented by most 20th-century histories, but rather as a carefully planned military operation set out by masterminding officers and obedient subordinates. Such a characterization may have been deemed more fitting given that England was at war with Spain at the time of the play's printing. In any case, the Spanish characters play their parts as national enemies flawlessly, being both cruel enough to provoke outrage in an audience and formidable enough to inspire vigilance. Foils to the craven men of Antwerp, the Spaniards exhibit martial discipline, cunning, and, most importantly, respect for courageous men. When Stump is finally killed at the end of the play, the fantastically evil Sancto Danila goes so far as to praise his heroism and secure him an honourable burial, in direct contrast to the cruelty previously shown to the crippled soldier by his own people. As quintessential men of violence, the Spanish are shown to esteem true fighters as much as they scorn the flabby burghers whom they murder with such abandon.
