= Bart Visman =

Dutch composer

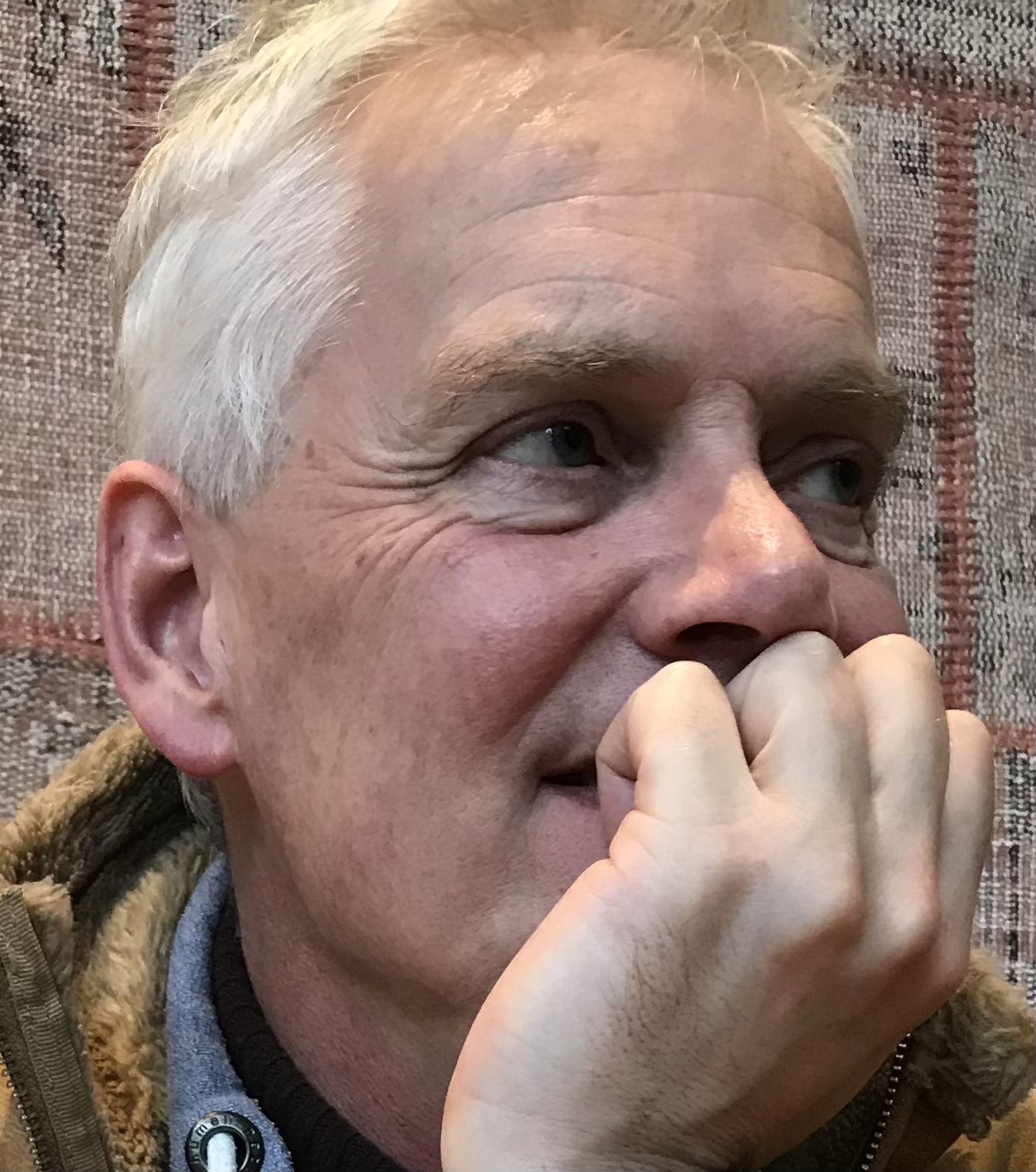
Bart Visman

Bart Visman (born 21 October 1962 in Naarden) is a Dutch composer. He is well known in the Netherlands for composing the children's opera De roep van de kinkhoorn to a libretto by the late Dutch children's author Paul Biegel.
