= Bertil Schmüll =

Dutch engraver (born 1946)

Bertil H.W. Schmüll (born 8 June 1946) is a Dutch engraver, known professionally by his first name Bertil, who has been compared in a modern sense in form and style to Albrecht Dürer. He works with the techniques of engraving and drypoint.

He was born at Naarden in the Netherlands. He trained from 1962-1966 at the School of Graphic Arts (in Amsterdam, then the Rijksacademie voor beeldende kunsten (National Academy of Visual Arts) (1968).

Schmüll's early commercial work has included the engraving of postage stamps and heraldic emblems. In 1973 he established his own art workshop and has since worked as an independent artist, latterly in collaboration with Karl Boegli, Master Engraver.

Bertil is widely exhibited in Europe.

== Publications ==
- Bertil: Gravures au burin / Kupferstiche / Copper engravings 1972-1997 (French/German/English), Editions Gilles Attinger, Hauterive, 1997; ISBN 2-88256-092-3 at the instigation of Karl Boegli, Master Engraver ( translated)
