= Dutch Fortress Museum =

Coordinates: 52°17′36″N 5°9′36″E

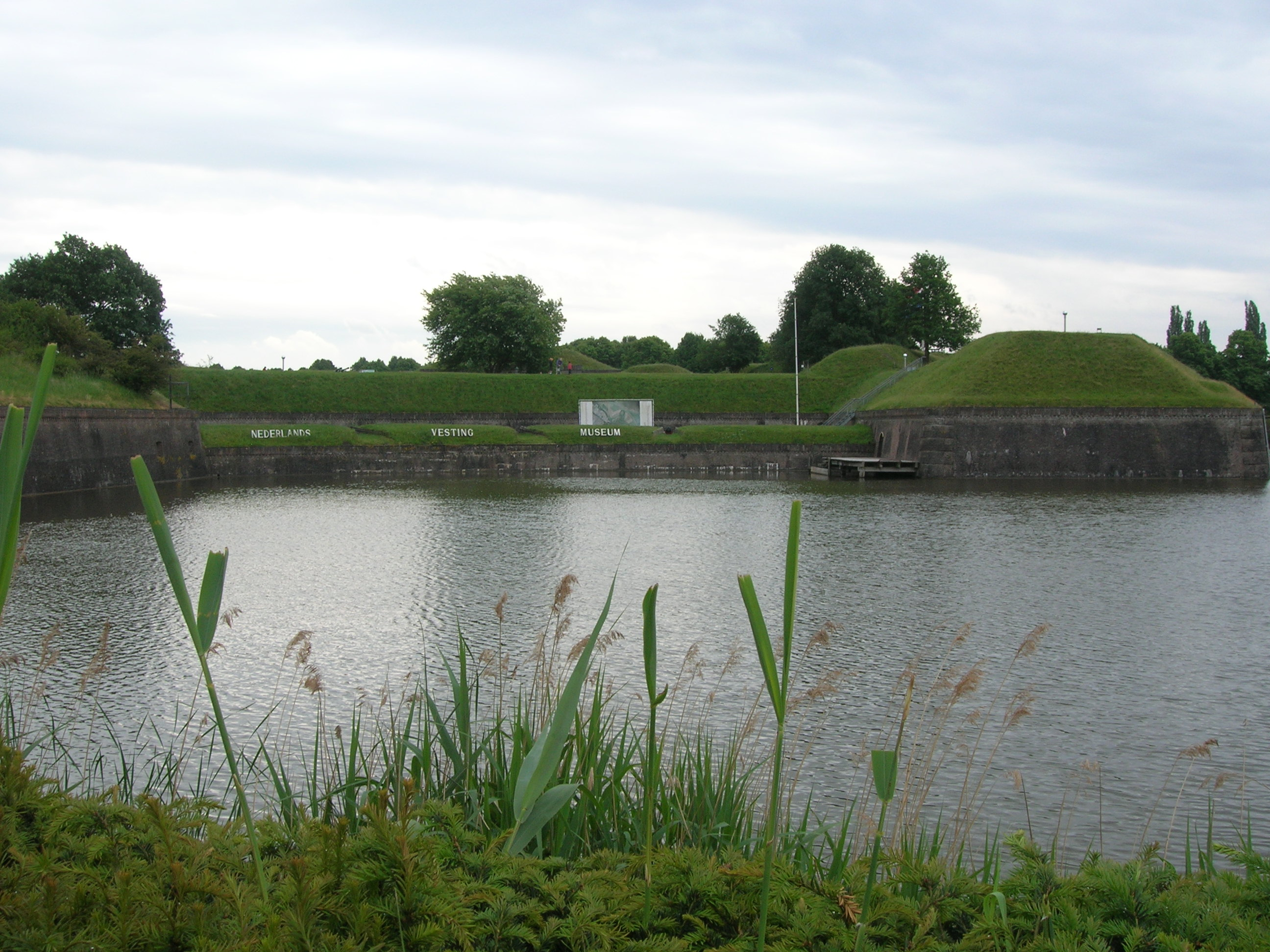
Side view of the Nederlands Vestingmuseum. On the left are casemates. On the right are the powder tester (the pole), and the water postern.

The Dutch Fortress Museum (Nederlands Vestingmuseum) is located in the city of Naarden, the Netherlands. The museum was established by volunteers in 1955 at bastion Turfpoort, one of six bastions that give the walled city its distinctive star shape. (During World War II, allied bombers returning to Great Britain from bombing missions used it as a marker.) The fortifications themselves, including the bastions, date from the period 1575–1585, when King Philip II of Spain ordered them to be constructed.

The museum includes exhibits on the history of fortification, garrison life, the Dutch Water Line, and the history of the city of Naarden-Vesting. The exhibits are housed in rooms in four casemates; because the casemates consist of a thick layer of earth, temperatures in the rooms are relatively stable, being warm in winter and cool in summer. Above ground, the museum also contains a collection of guns from the 19th century.

== Tourist access ==
The museum is open all year round from Tuesday through to Sunday. The museum is open on all public holidays except Christmas, New Years Day and King's Day (27 April).

A museum boat conducts tours on the easterly side of the moat from April to October. The boat leaves from a jetty by the water postern.

On the third Sunday of every month, they host their Canonneers Day event where they fire their 1810 cannons.

== Design ==
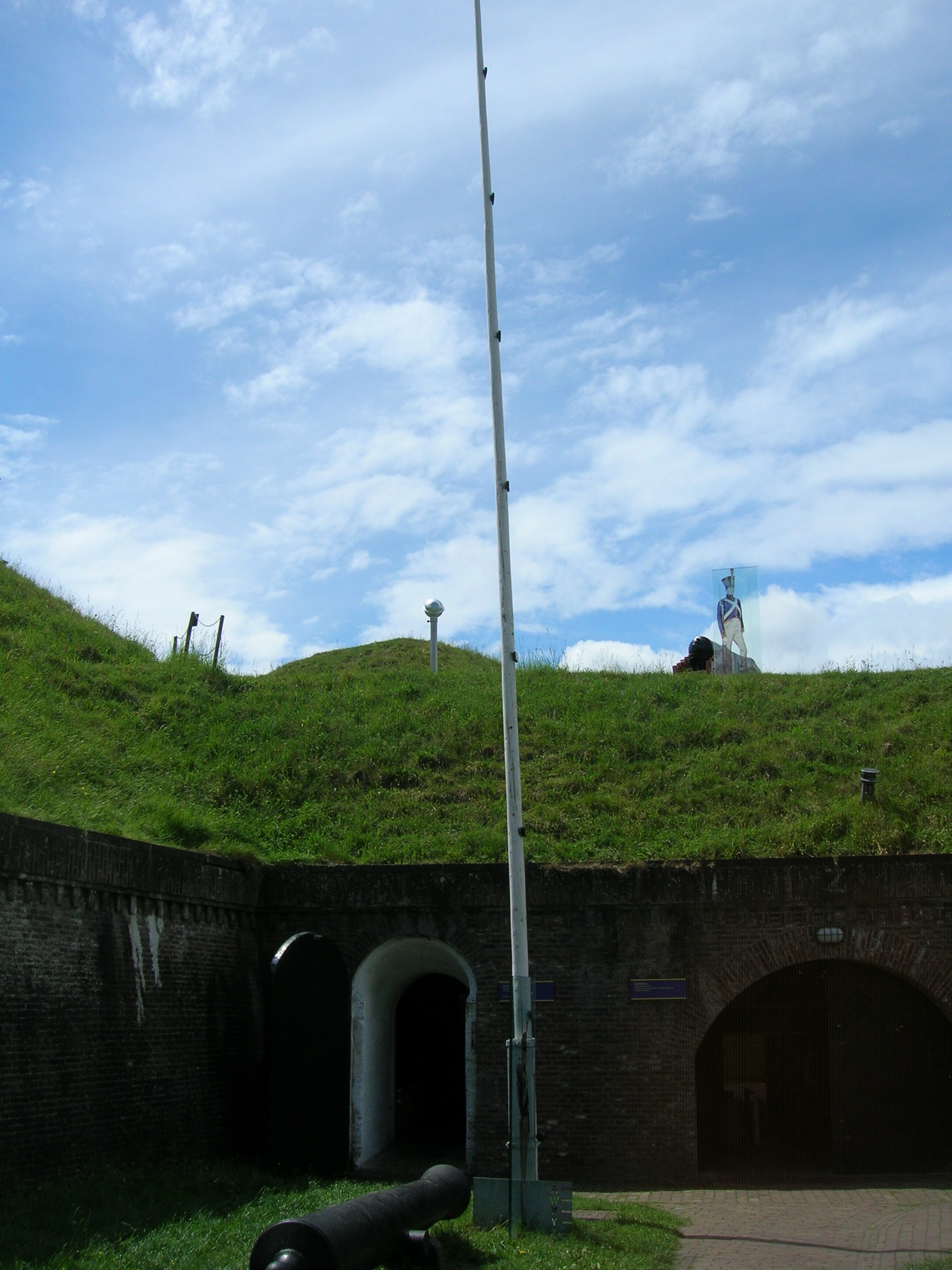
Powder tester. There is a small mortar at the base in which one puts a measured sample of the powder one wishes to test. One then puts a cannonball on top of the powder. When the powder is ignited it throws the ball into the air. The mast is calibrated and the height the cannonball reaches indicates the quality of the powder.

The bastion has an arrow-head shape with five points. The walls consist of two meters of layers of brick. Casemates built into the city walls near the narrow base of the arrow head contained guns that permitted the defenders to fire along the main moat. In the area by the lower right-hand flank of the bastion there is a gunpowder testing pole, which gunners in the 17th and 18th centuries used to test the quality of the gunpowder they received.

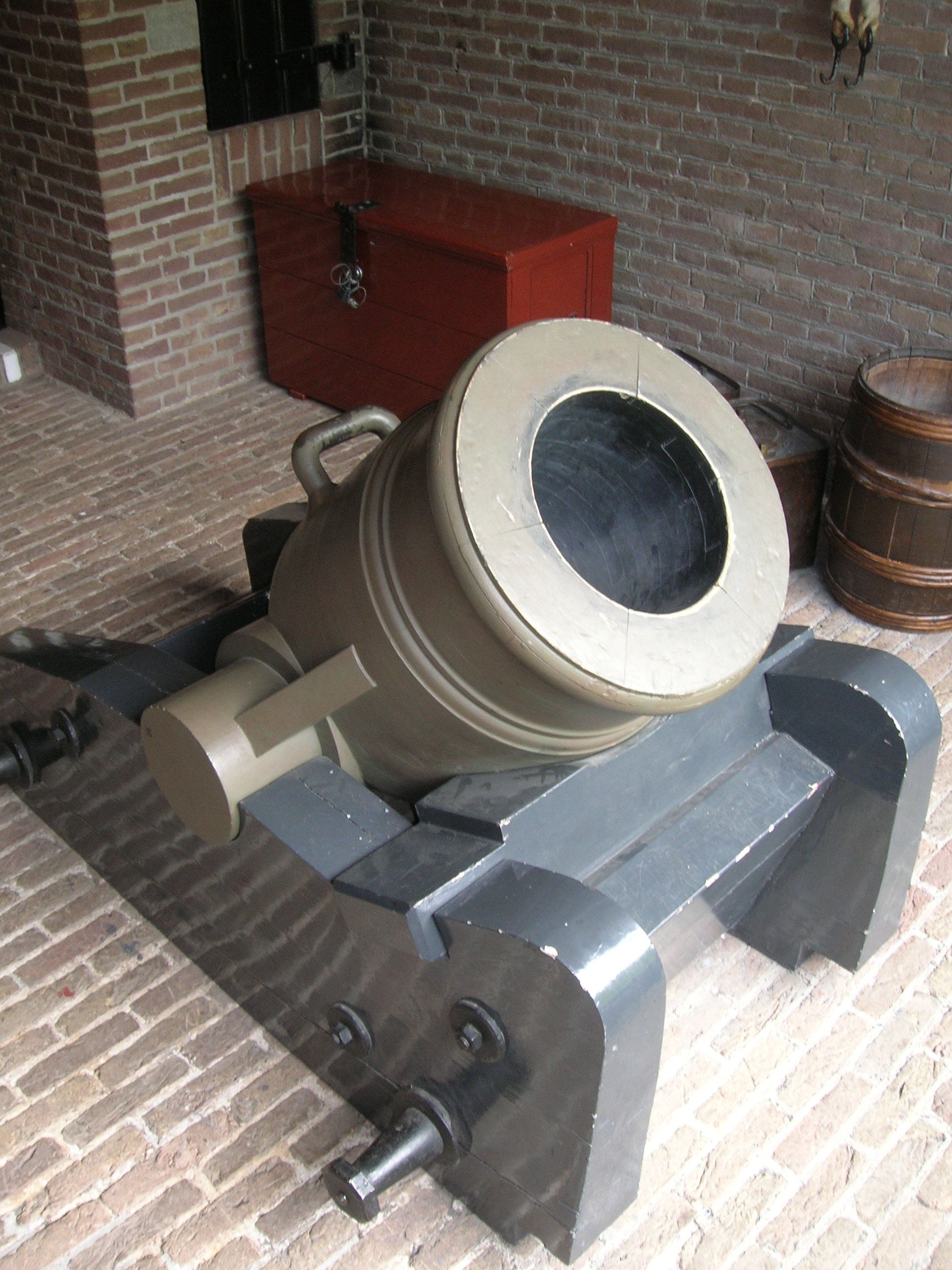
Replica mortar

To the right side of the bastion there is a water postern. Next to it is the bastion's powder room. Near the tip of the bastion there is a mortar casemate with quarters for officers and soldiers and is home to a replica 29 cm mortar.
