= Naarden =

- City
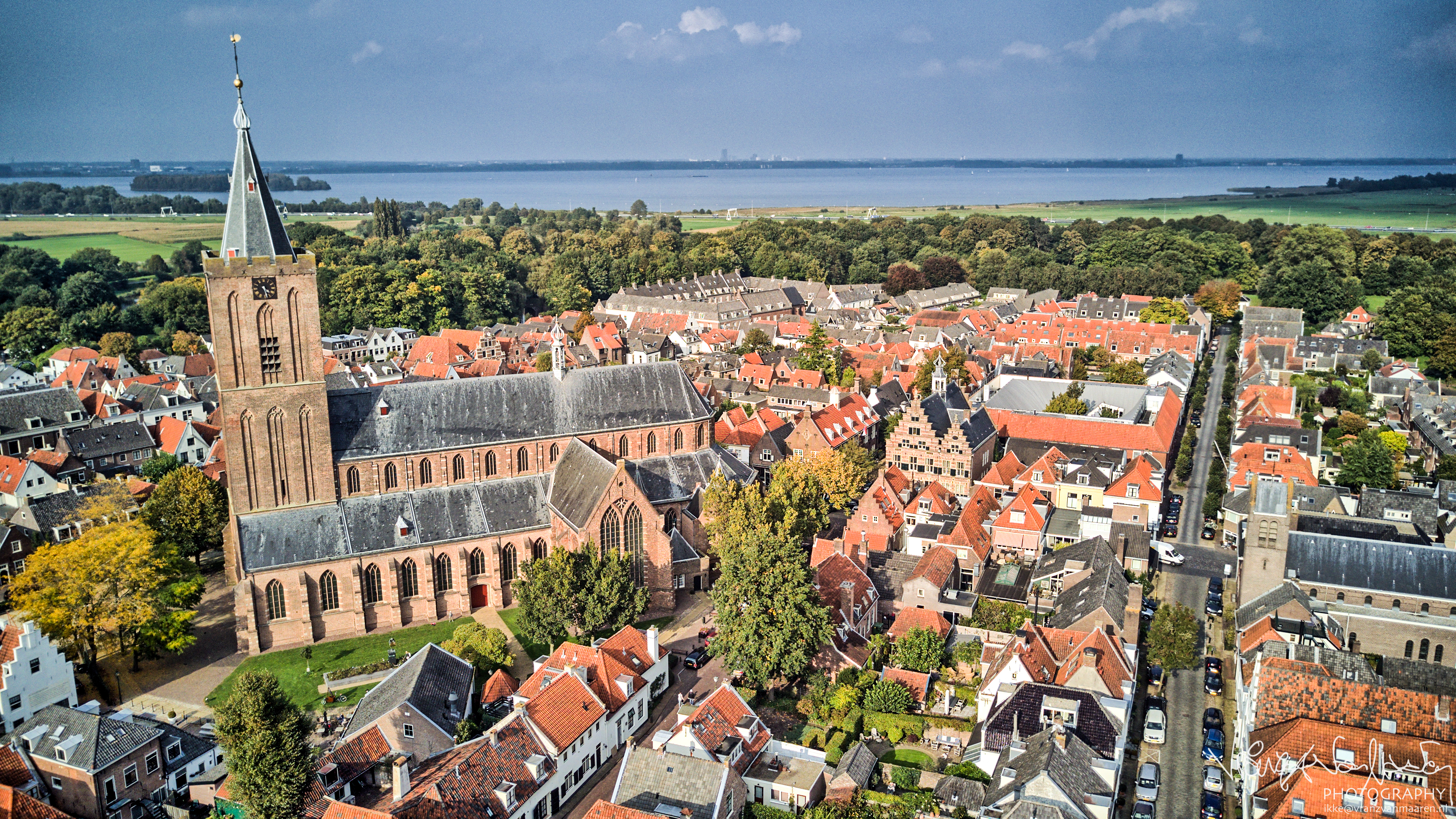
- Aerial view of the historic city of Naarden

- Flag Coat of arms

- Location in the Netherlands Location in the province of North Holland in the Netherlands
- Coordinates: 52°17′43″N 05°09′44″E
- Country: Netherlands
- Province: North Holland
- Municipality: Gooise Meren
- Elevation: 3 m (9.8 ft)

Population (2021)
  - Total: 17,555
- Demonym(s): Naardenees, Naardenaar
- Time zone: UTC+1 (CET)
  - Summer (DST): UTC+2 (CEST)
- Postcode: 1410–1414
- Area code: 035
- Website: www.naarden.nl

Naarden (Dutch pronunciation: [ˈnaːrdə(n)]) is a city and former municipality in the Gooi region in the province of North Holland, Netherlands. It has been part of the new municipality of Gooise Meren since 2016. Along with the other towns in Gooise Meren, it is considered an affluent neighborhood.

== History ==
Naarden was granted its city rights in 1300 (the only town in the Gooi with these rights) and later developed into a fortified garrison town with a textile industry.

In 1572, the city was sacked and burnt down, and only 60 people survived the Massacre of Naarden. The massacre was committed by Spanish soldiers against the townspeople of Naarden as part of a punitive expedition against Dutch rebels later known as the Spanish Fury. The destruction of the city galvanized the Dutch rebels, leading them to continue the Dutch War of Independence against Spain.

Naarden is an example of a star fort, complete with fortified walls and a moat. The moat and walls have been restored on numerous occasions, most notably during the French era (1795-1814). After the Battle of Leipzig (1813), the Netherlands were liberated by an allied force of Dutch, Prussian and Russian armies. During this period, Naarden was besieged for months since the French commander didn't believe that Napoleon was captured. In May 1814, the French soldiers left the city in a retreat with honour (see Siege of Naarden (1813–1814).

John Amos Comenius, 17th century Moravian born Czech educator was buried in the city, and his mausoleum is open to visitors.

Despite its earlier importance, Naarden's population was surpassed by Hilversum in the 18th century and today it is smaller than its neighbour Bussum.

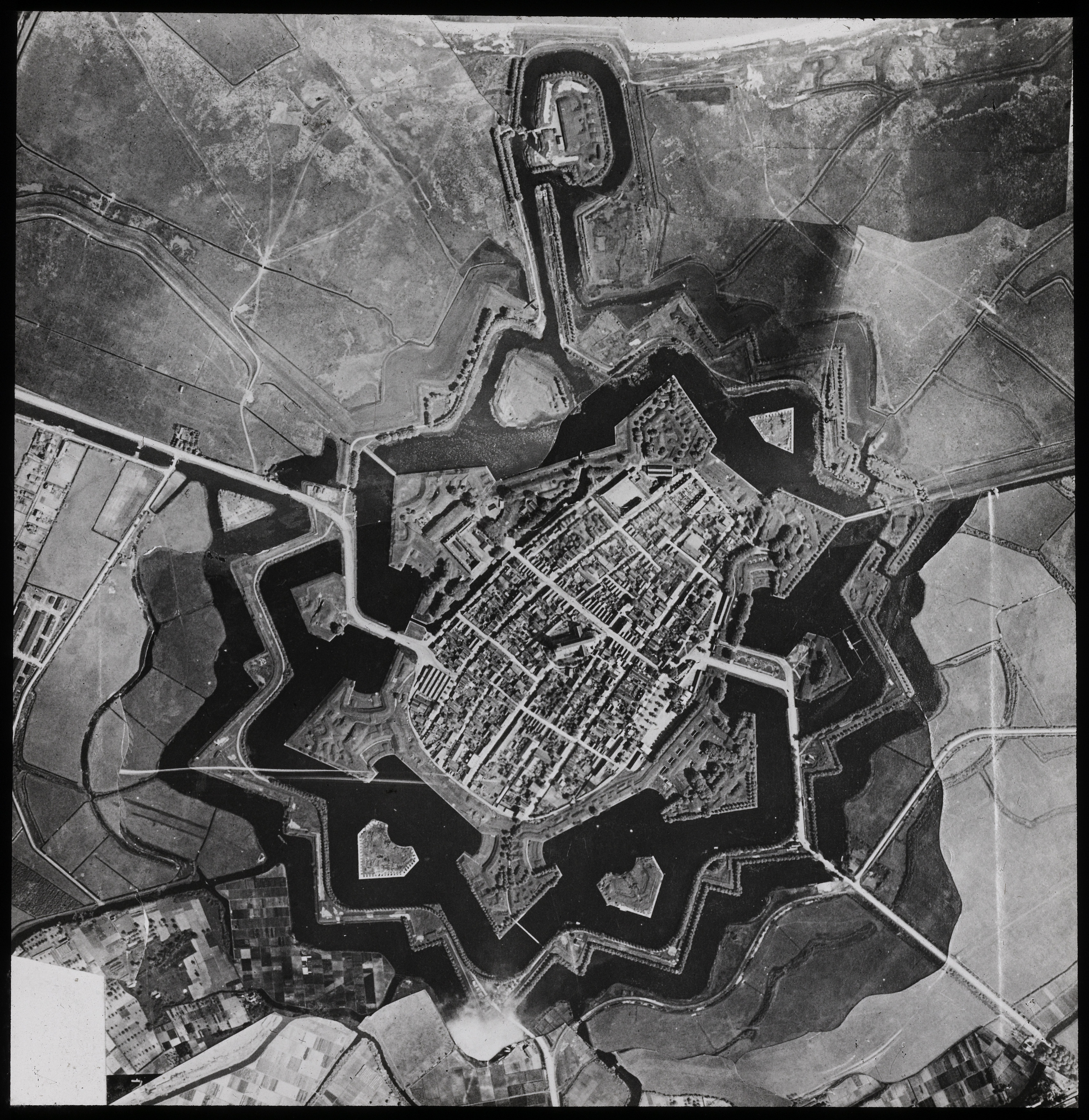
Aerial photograph of Naarden, inter-war period

The city's distinctive shape made it a rallying point for Allied bombers returning to England after raids on Germany.

Naarden was a separate municipality until 2015. On 1 January 2016, the municipality of Naarden merged with Muiden and Bussum to form the new municipality of Gooise Meren.

== Geography ==
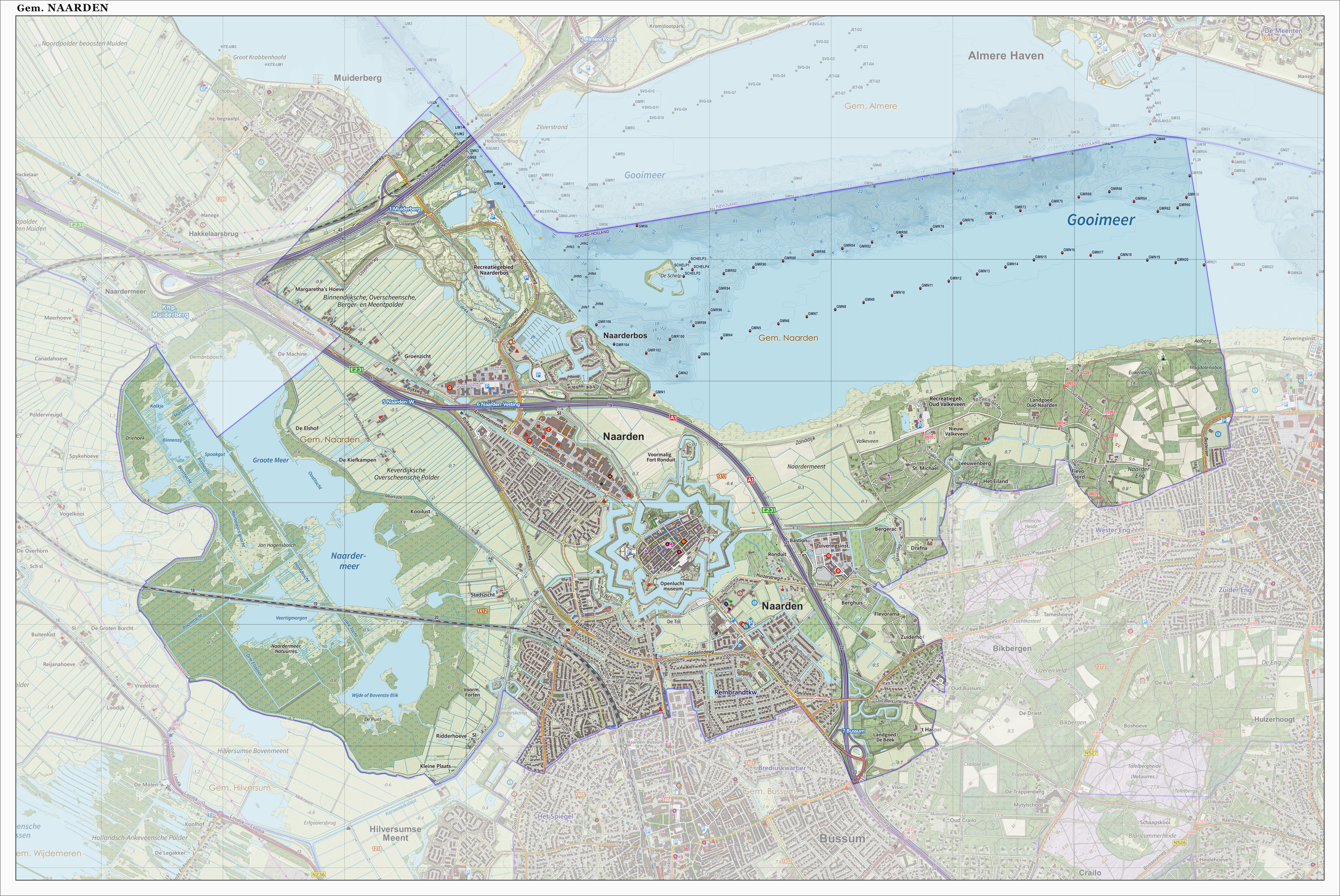
Map of the former municipality of Naarden, June 2015

The city of Naarden is located in the municipality of Gooise Meren in the west of the Netherlands. It is situated in the Gooi region in the southeast of the province of North Holland.

=== Attractions ===
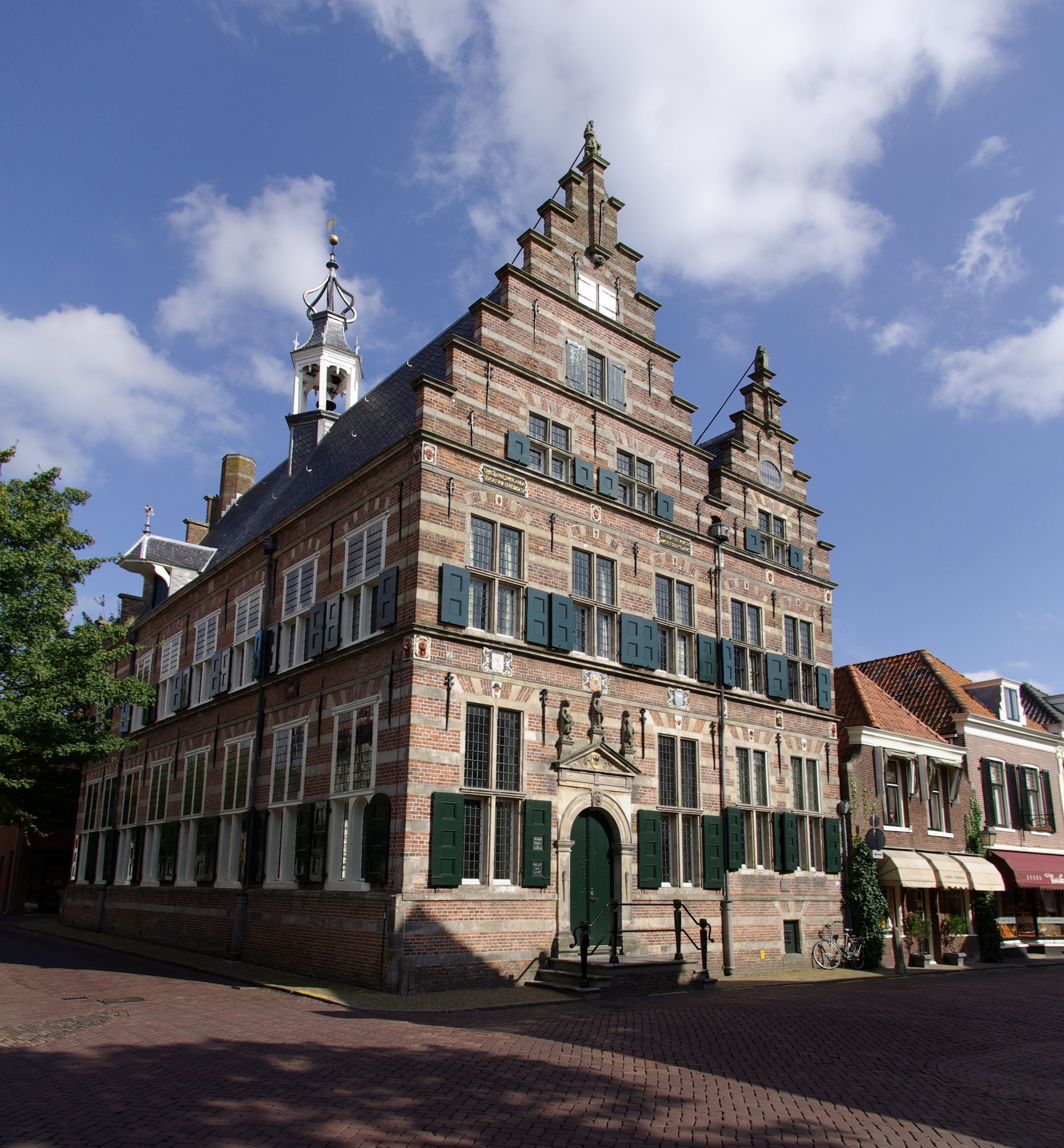
City hall

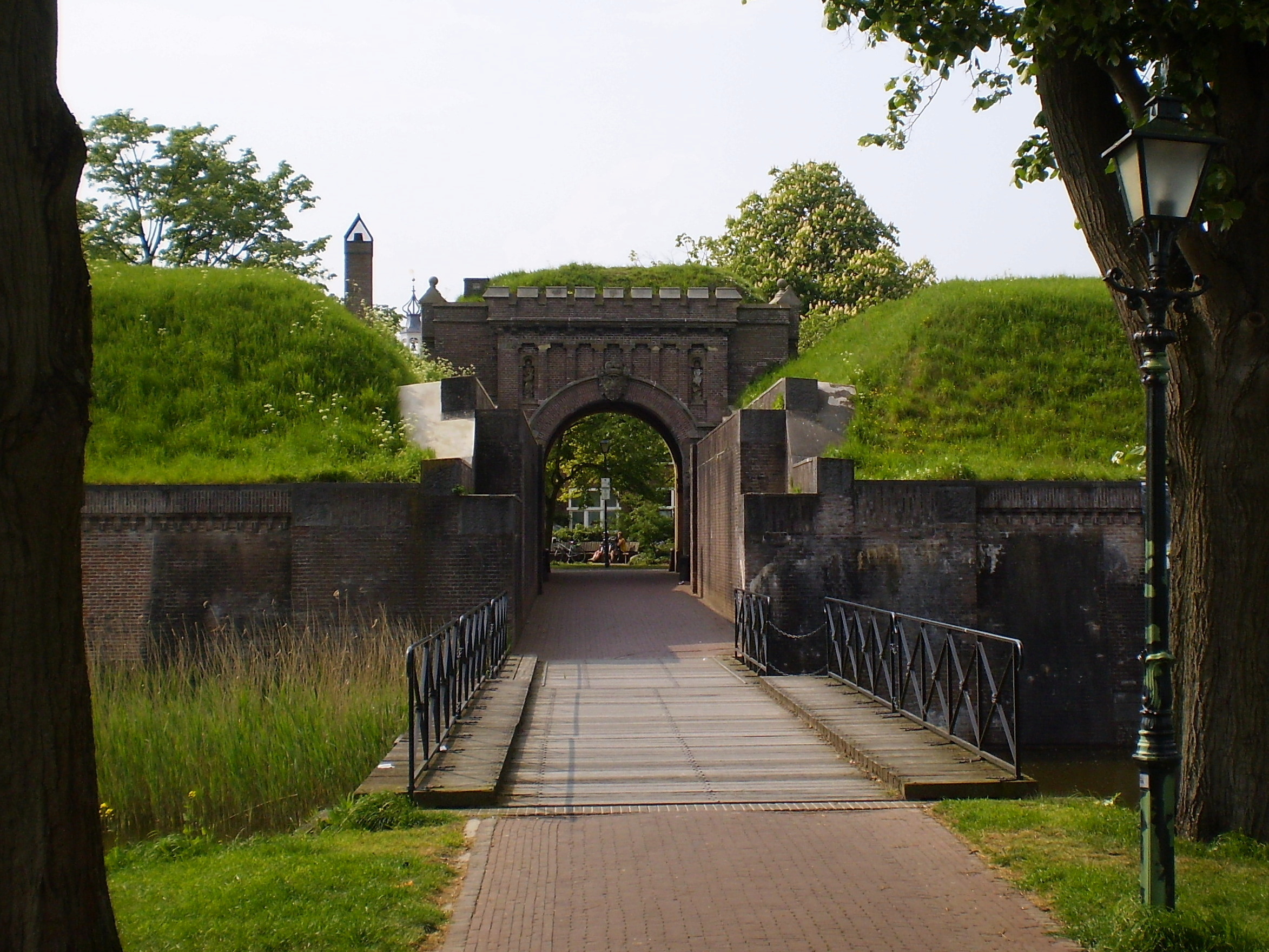
Fortress gate

Naarden is the home of the Dutch Fortress Museum (Nederlands Vestingmuseum). Naarden hosts the bi-annual Naarden Photo Festival and, on Good Friday, a performance of Bach's St. Matthew Passion in the local church, which is called the Great Church or St. Vitus Church.

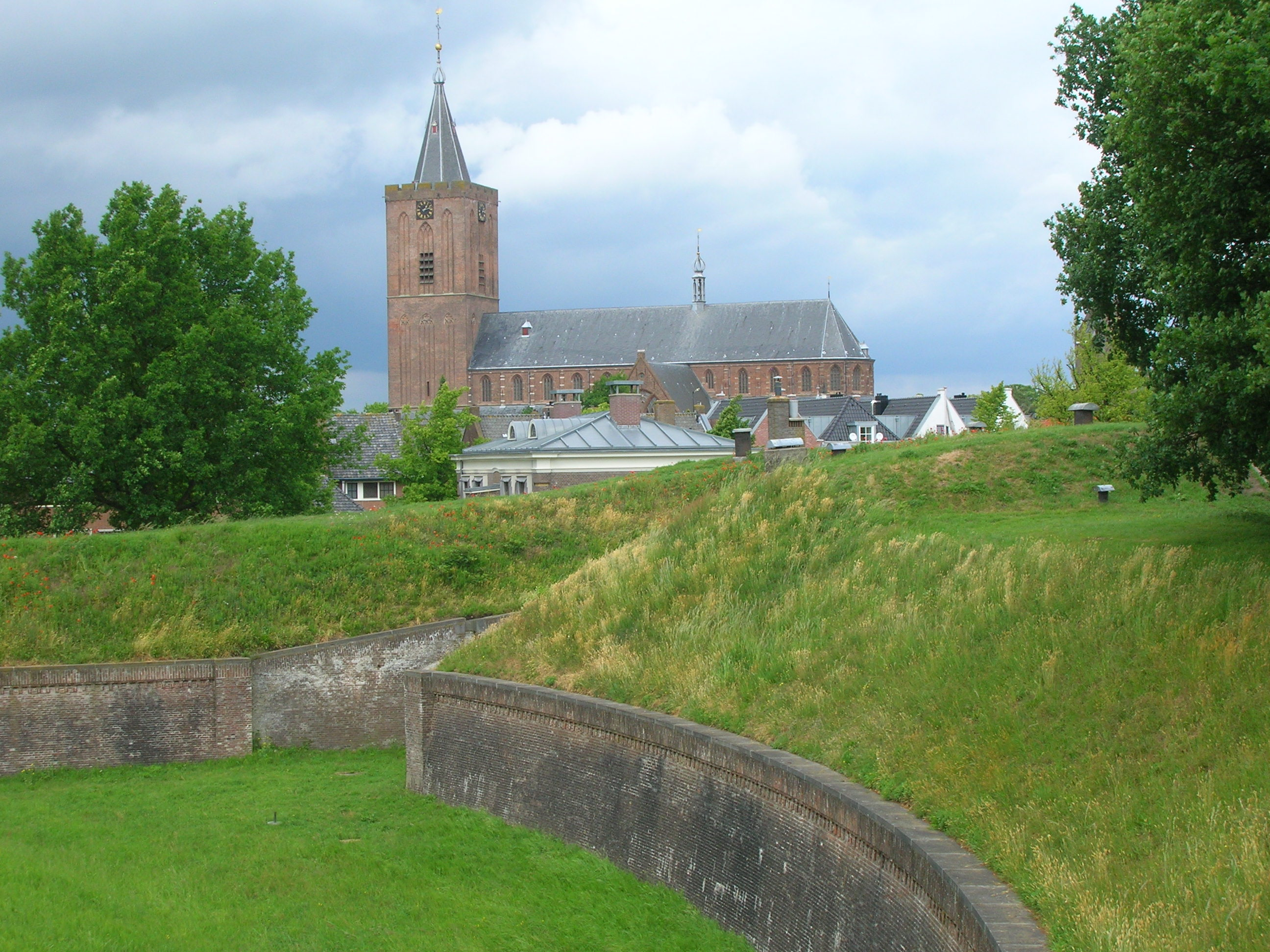
The Great Church

The Great Church (Grote Kerk) in Marktstraat dates from the 15th century. Prior to the Protestant Reformation it was named for St. Vitus. It is one of the oldest surviving churches in The Netherlands, having had the good fortune to survive the Spanish invasion of 1572 and the subsequent burning of the town. The church has numerous wooden vaults painted with scenes from the Old and New Testaments. These were hidden for many years and only rediscovered in a recent restoration. The church is the venue for a number of cultural activities such as organ music nights and the bi-annual Naarden Photo festival.

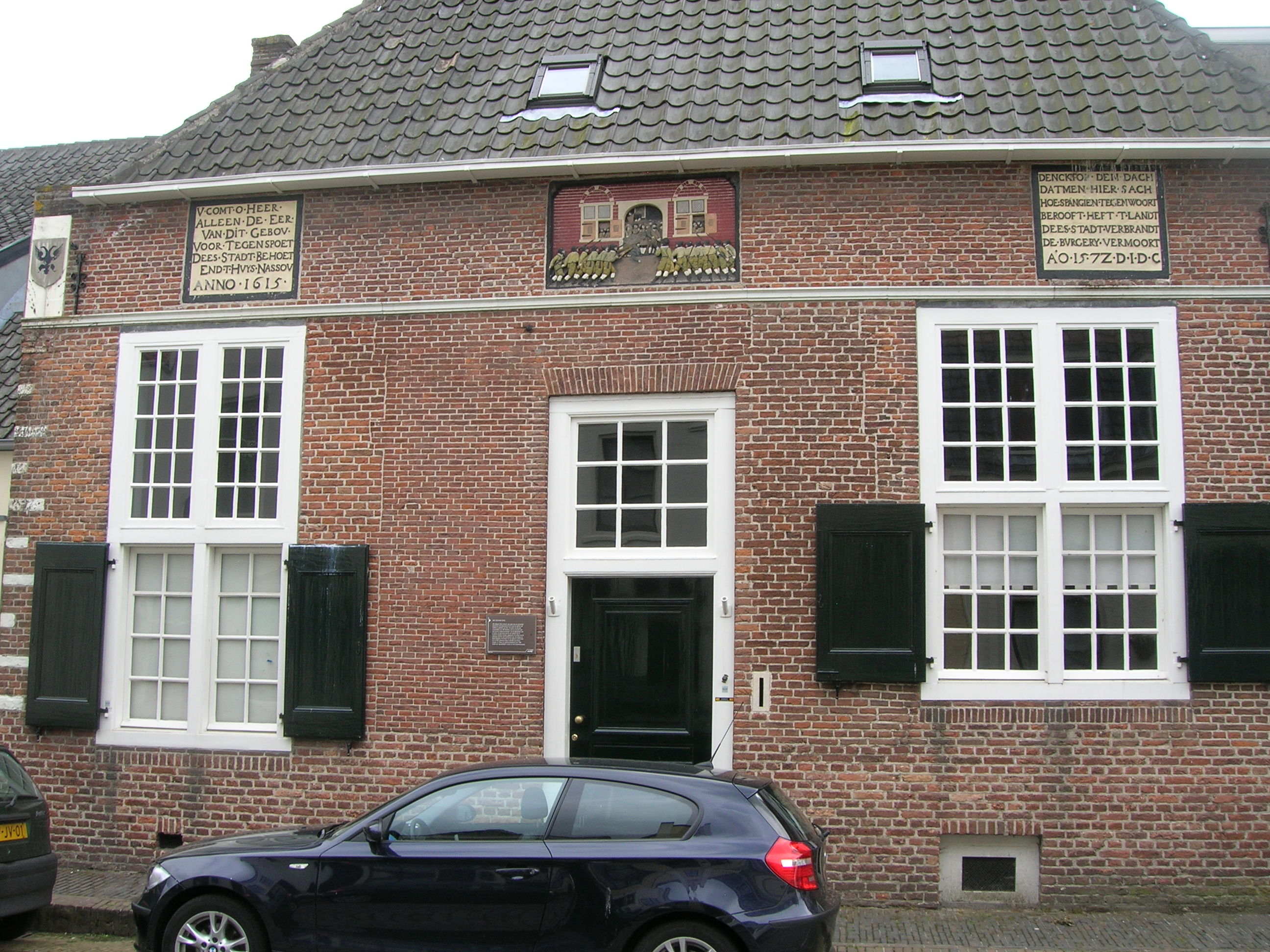
The Spanish House, with design commemorating the massacre of 1572

The Spanish House (Spaanse Huis), situated at Turfpoortstraat 27, was originally a church building converted to house migrants. In 1572 Spanish troops conducted a massacre of some 700 inhabitants who had gathered to hear a peace proposal. The Spanish then fired on the assembled citizens, and went on to set fire to the town. A plaque above the lintel of the door and below the eaves commemorates the massacre. In 1615, after the population had reestablished itself, they built the city hall on the site. Part of the building was given over to De Waag (The Scales House), the municipal office entrusted with the verification of weights and measures. The building later served a French garrison as a bakery, turning out over 1000 loaves per day. From 1967 until 1992 it served as the Comenius museum. Today, the historic building serves as the Weegschaal Museum.

John Amos Comenius is buried in a mausoleum on Klooster straat 52°17′50.19″N 5°9′51.72″E. This receives many visitors from the Czech Republic, where he was born. Comenius is known as the inventor of our school system with grades and different classes.

== Transport ==
The nearest station is Naarden-Bussum railway station, which has services to Almere, Amersfoort, Amsterdam and Utrecht.

== Notable residents ==
- Nordin Amrabat (born 1987), soccer player
- Willem Arondeus (1894–1943), professional artist, author and Dutch Resistance member
- Tim Coronel (born 1972), racing driver
- Tom Coronel (born 1972), racing driver
- Maarten de Bruijn (born 1965), product designer
- Annemarie Groen (born 1955), backstroke swimmer
- Egbert Haverkamp-Begemann (1923–2017), art historian
- Tom van 't Hek (born 1958), field hockey player and coach
- Frank Martin (1890–1974), Swiss composer who lived in Naarden from 1954
- Bertil Schmüll (born 1946), engraver
- Salomon van Ruysdael (~1602–1670), painter
- Bart Visman (born 1962), composer
- Jip Janssen (born 1997), Olympic gold medal winning field hockey player

== See also ==
- Naarderbos
- Spanish Empire
