= Siege of Naarden (1813–1814) =

Siege from 1813 to 1814 during the War of the Sixth Coalition

- Part of War of the Sixth Coalition
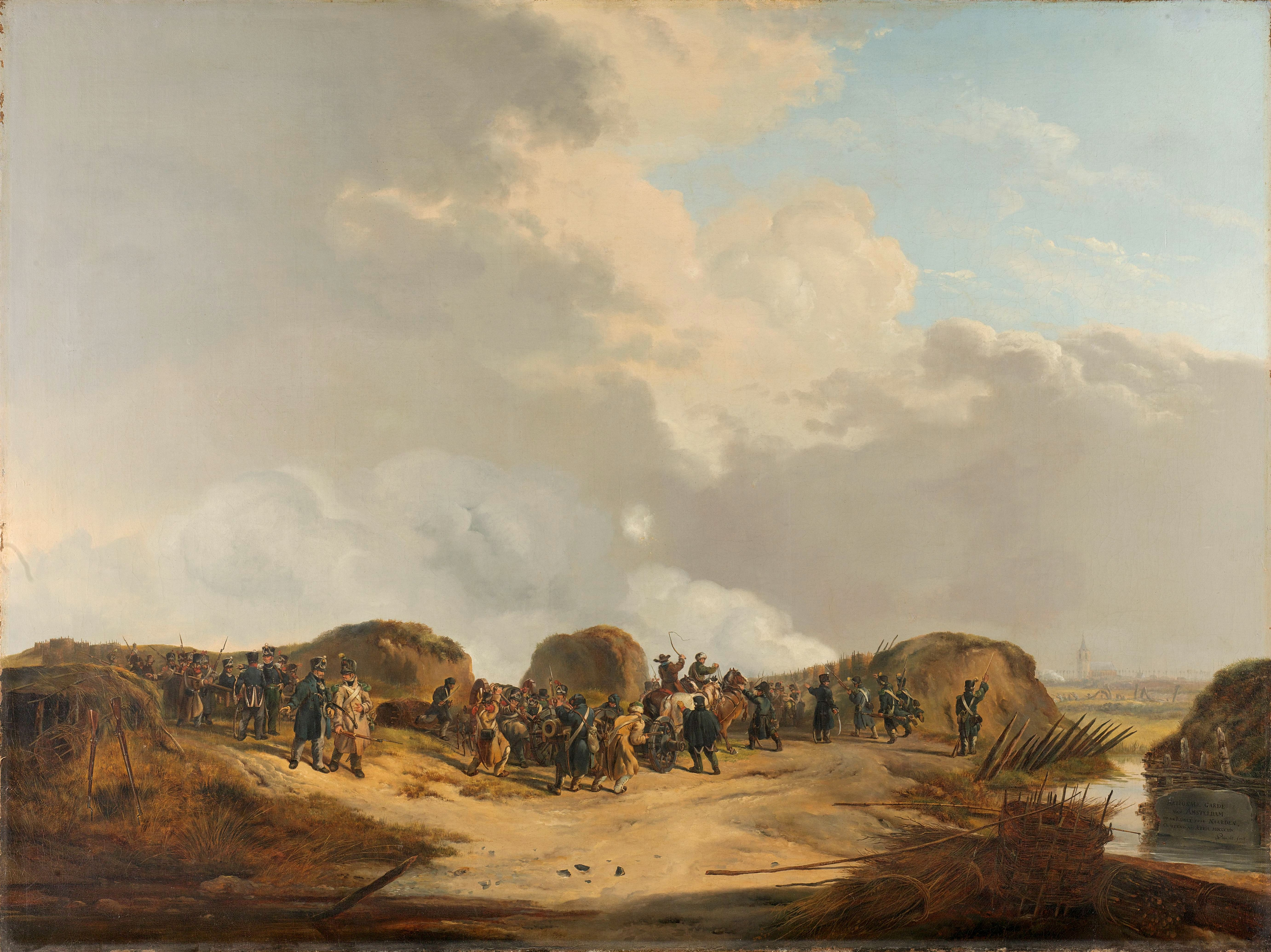
- The arrival of soldiers and guns of the National Guard of Amsterdam at the entrenchments outside Naarden.
Date	17 November 1813 – 12 May 1814
Location	Naarden, Zuyderzée, France (present-day Netherlands)
Result	Russo-Dutch victory

Belligerents
Netherlands; Russia	France

Commanders and leaders
Cornelis Krayenhoff	Jacques Quétard de La Porte

The siege of Naarden was an investment of the city of Naarden from November 1813 until May 1814 by a Dutch and Russian army as part of the liberation of the Netherlands during the War of the Sixth Coalition. This siege took months, since the French commander didn't believe that Napoleon had been defeated and had abdicated. Finally, the French soldiers were granted a retreat with honour.

== Prelude ==
In October 1813, Napoleon was defeated at the Battle of Leipzig. As a result, the Sixth Coalition attempted to expel the French from the Netherlands, which had been annexed by France in 1810. William Frederick, son of the last stadtholder of the old Dutch Republic, had been in exile in England, and returned to Holland in November 1813. He received military assistance from Prussian and Russian armies.

== The battle ==
Russian cossacks were the first soldiers that approached Naarden. French soldiers retreated into the fortress, awaiting the (hoped for) return of Napoleon. This scenario happened in multiple cities in Holland, like Den Helder, Delfzijl and Gorinchem. However, the French forces in Naarden didn't surrender and were highly capable of keeping their strength. They even had some Dutch soldiers fighting on their side, which were enlisted in the Grande Armée. During the siege, most of the city was destroyed by bombardments. However, there were almost no casualties since the French and civilians were capable of hiding within the fortress walls.

When the allied forces received the message that Napoleon was captured, the French forces didn't believe them and held on. Finally, after many attempts, a special message from the French government was able to convince them after all. In May 1814, the French soldiers were given a retreat with honour.

== Aftermath ==
Although the siege of Naarden was strategically not highly relevant, the victory was of significant importance to William I. He needed to demonstrate that the Sovereign Principality of the United Netherlands was capable of surviving on its own as the great powers were redrawing Europe's borders. In the end, the Kingdom of the Netherlands was granted sovereignty (as opposed to becoming part of the British Empire or the Kingdom of Prussia), and tasked to function as a buffer state.

In the short term, however, Napoleon escaped from his imprisonment on Elba and returned to France. This resulted in the battle of Waterloo in June 1815.
