= Spanish Fury at Mechelen =

1572 sack of Mechelen, modern Belgium

Coordinates: 51.0167°N 4.4667°E

- Part of Eighty Years' War
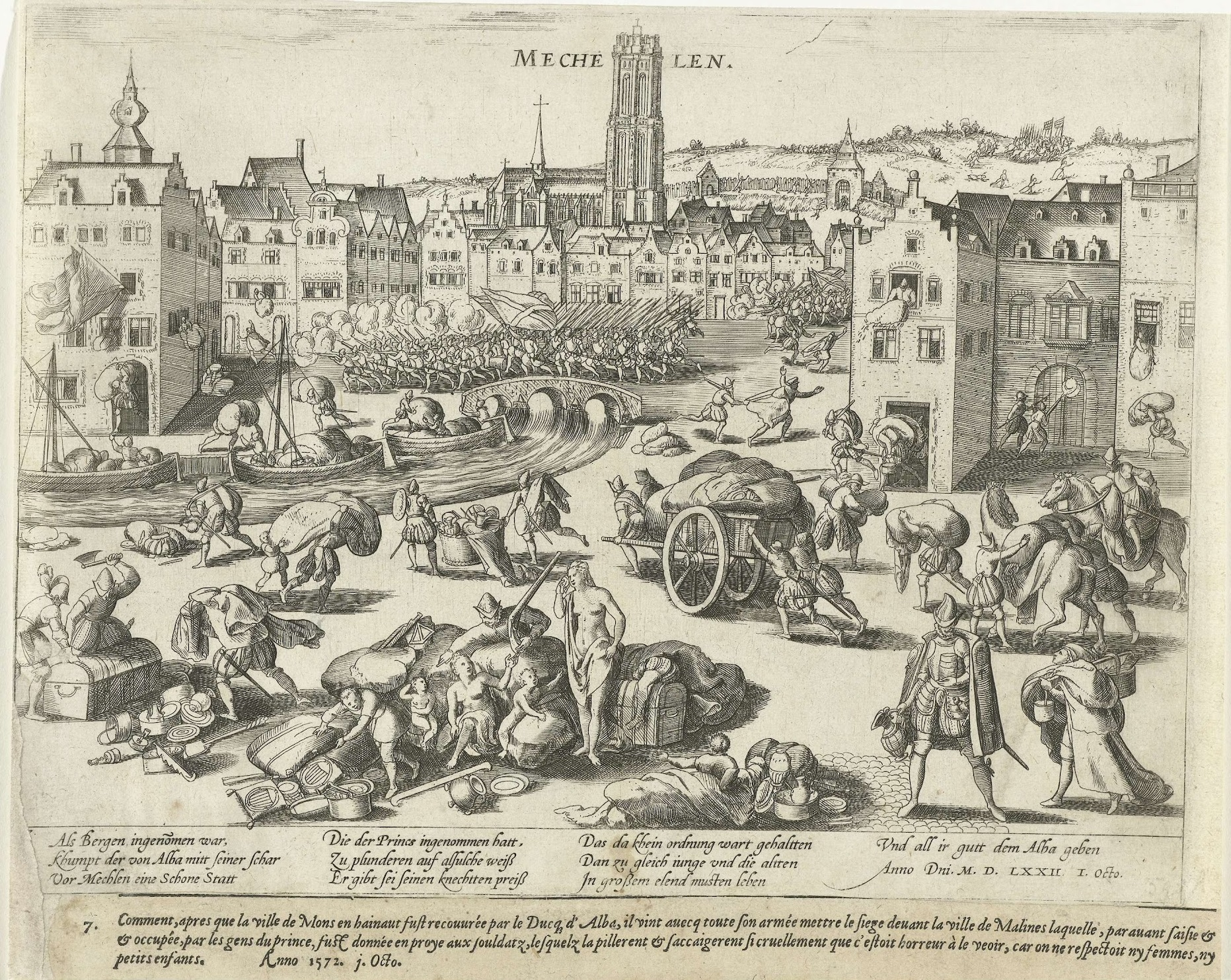
- The sacking and looting of Mechelen by Spanish troops, October 2, 1572
| Date | October 2, 1572 |
| Location | Mechelen, modern Belgium |
| Result | All the rebellious towns of Brabant surrender |

Belligerents
| Spain | People of Mechelen |

Commanders and leaders
| (Spain) Fadrique Álvarez de Toledo | Bernard van Merode |

The Spanish Fury at Mechelen (Dutch: Spaanse Furie in Mechelen) was an event in the Eighty Years' War on October 2, 1572 in which the city of Mechelen was conquered by the Spanish army and brutally sacked.

== Prelude ==
In spring and summer 1572, many cities in the Low Countries came under control of William of Orange, some actively supporting the rebels, other taking a more cautious attitude. Mechelen had opened its gates to the troops of William on August 31. William continued his advance towards Mons but left a garrison in Mechelen under command of Bernard van Merode.

On September 21, William was forced by a large Spanish army under the Duke of Alba to withdraw to Holland. The Duke of Alba now wanted to retake all cities in the south and decided to make an example of one of them. He ordered his son Fadrique Álvarez de Toledo to punish Mechelen for tolerating a rebel garrison. Plundering this rich city would also quiet his troops, which had not received any pay in a long time.

== The sack of Mechelen ==
When Bernard van Merode heard that a much stronger Spanish force was approaching Mechelen, he and his men left the city. The mainly Catholic people of Mechelen welcomed the Spanish by singing psalms of penitence in a gesture of surrender. Despite this, Fadrique Álvarez de Toledo unleashed his troops upon the city for three days of slaughter, rape and pillaging. Alba reported to King Philip II (who later imprisoned him) afterwards that "no nail was left in the wall".

In his Histories of the United Netherlands (1728), Protestant theologian and historian Jean Leclerc wrote the following account:

In Mechelen, there were four companies of footsoldiers, and two hundred cavalrymen, who could not prevent the voorstad from being overwhelmed. The natural son of Don Ferdinand de Toledo was wounded during this event, which embittered the Duke so much that he made the city pay for it with great cruelty. It was in no state of defence; therefore, the garrison left at night. The next morning, being the 1st of October, the clergy had the gates opened, and came in procession to beg the Duke to have mercy on the city. But the Spaniards, mocking their prayers, entered, partially by the gates, partially over the walls that they scaled. They beat to death everything they ran into, even [those who were] unarmed; they violated the women and the young daughters, in the presence of their husbands and parents, despite them being Catholics, yes, even the clerical virgins. The city was irrevocably plundered, and the loot was estimated at four times a hundred thousand guilders. To cover this cruelty with a semblance of justice, the Duke made a proclamation on the 6th of that month, in which he confiscated all the goods of those who had participated in the disturbances, and ordered them to hand over their goods within two days.

== Aftermath ==
In the short term, the sack of Mechelen had the desired effect. All cities in Alba's path surrendered without resistance. The next example would be set in the Spanish Fury at Zutphen on November 15.

It is important to distinguish the so-called "Spanish Furies" in 1572 from the Spanish Fury at Antwerp in 1576, as these were explicitly ordered by the military commanders, while the sack of Antwerp was perpetrated by mutinous troops.
