= Sack of Antwerp =

Part of the Eighty Years' War

Coordinates: 51°12′48″N 4°24′10″E

- Part of the Eighty Years' War
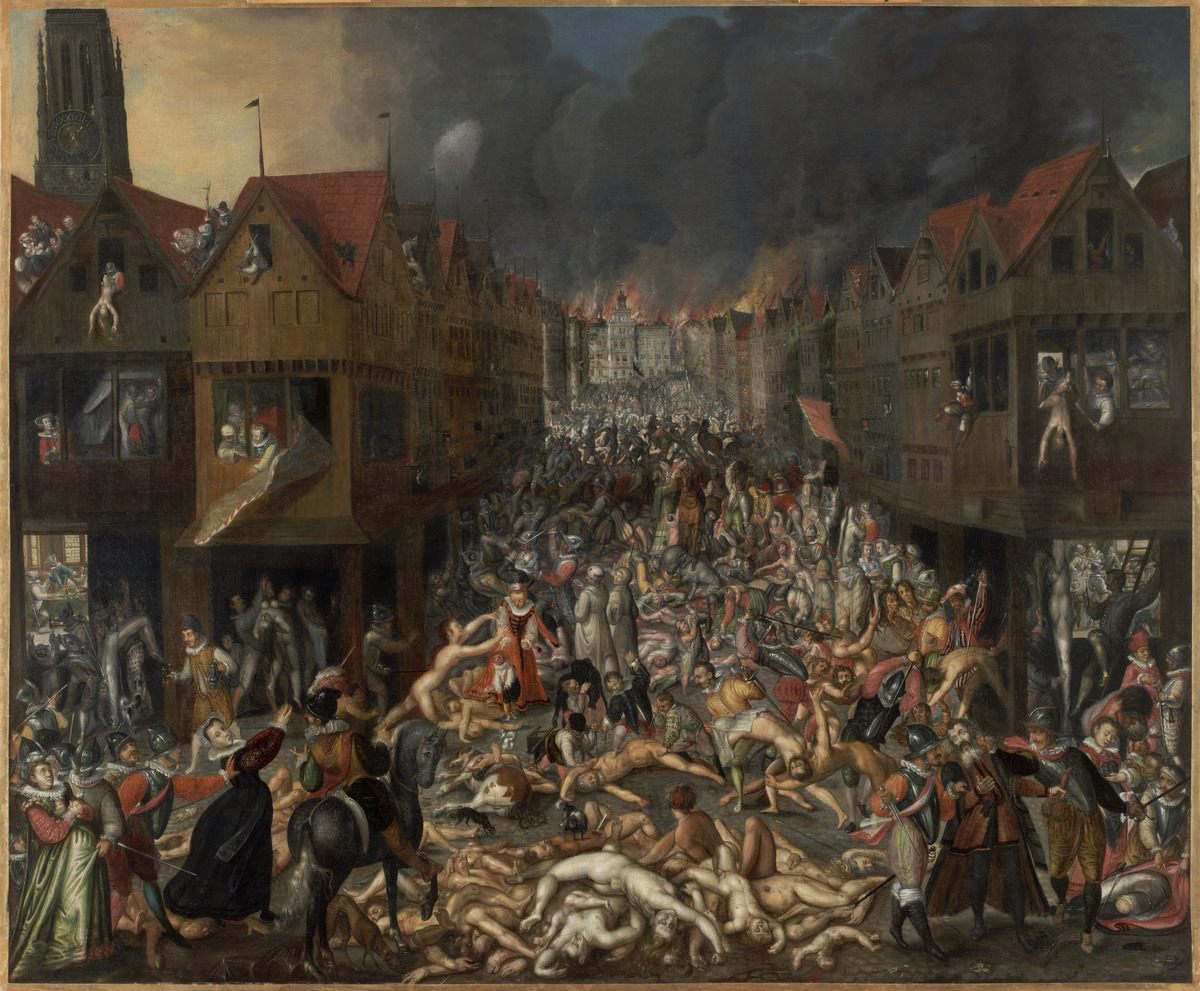
- Anonymous contemporary depiction of the "Spanish Fury" in Antwerp (Museum Aan de Stroom)
Date	4 November 1576
Location	Antwerp, Spanish Netherlands (present-day Belgium)
Result	Spanish victory

Belligerents
(Spain) Mutinying Spanish Tercios (Army of Flanders)	People of Antwerp; Brabantian troops German/Walloon troops

Commanders and leaders
(Spain) Sancho d'Avila (Spain) Julian Romero (Spain) Juan del Águila	Count Eberstein †; Governor Compagny; Marquis d’Havré

Strength
6,000	20,000 (civilians included)

Casualties and losses
Unknown	7,000–18,000 killed

The sack of Antwerp, often known as the Spanish Fury at Antwerp, was an episode of the Eighty Years' War. It is the greatest massacre in the history of the Low Countries.

On 4 November 1576, mutinying Spanish tercios of the Army of Flanders began the sack of Antwerp, leading to three days of horror among the population of the city, which was the cultural, economic and financial center of the Low Countries. The savagery of the sack led the provinces of the Low Countries to unite against the Spanish crown. The devastation also caused Antwerp's decline as the leading city in the region and paved the way for Amsterdam's rise.

== Causes ==
The principal cause of the sack was the delay in payment due to the soldiers by Philip II of Spain, who had recently declared bankruptcy. Bankers refused to perform the transactions the king of Spain asked of them until they had reached a compromise. Case in point, the transfer of the troops' salary from Spain could not be performed by letter of exchange (the 16th-century equivalent of a money order). So, the Spanish government had to transfer the actual cash by sea, which was a much more expensive, slow, and dangerous operation: for instance, in 1568, 400,000 florins intended as payment to the troops had been seized by the government of Elizabeth I when ships containing the florins sought shelter from a storm in English ports.

Spanish soldiers, angry at fighting without rest or pay against rebels, had already sacked Zierikzee and Aalst, causing the fifteen loyal provinces (Holland and Zeeland were in the hands of the rebels) to come together in States-General to remove the mercenaries from the Netherlands. It was an ordinary procedure with the soldiery then, and their procedure was invariable. Without breaking their celebrated discipline, they would choose a new leader, or Eletto, from their number and march in perfect order under him to whatever their target was. In this instance, the Spanish soldiers decided to find their belated pay for themselves by looting Antwerp.

== Events ==
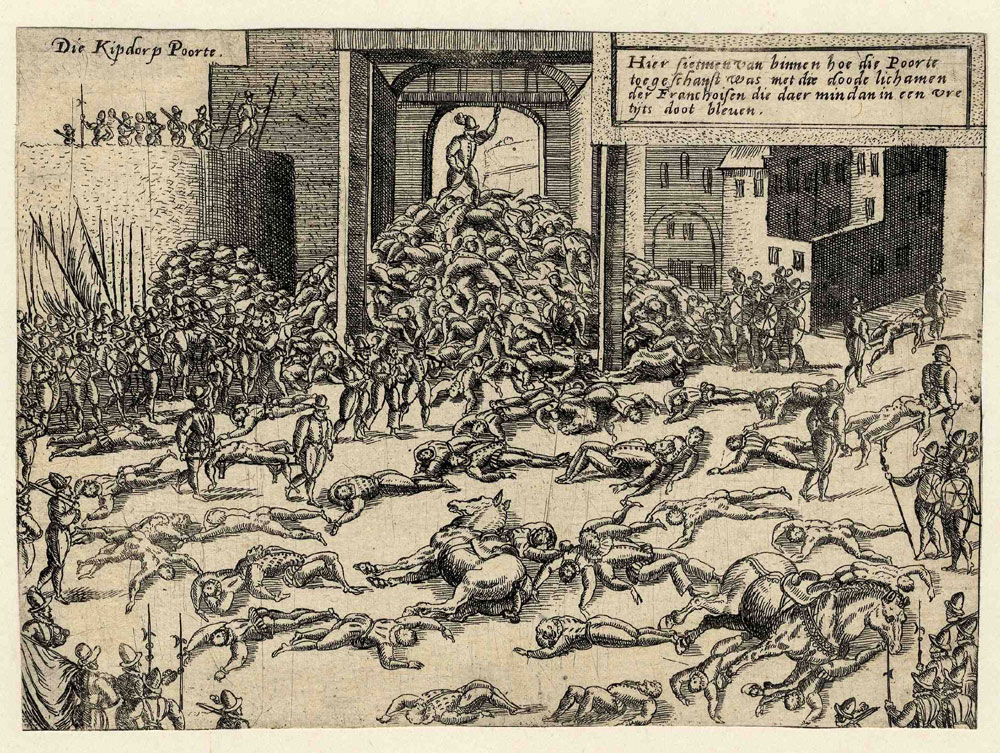
Antwerp is sacked.

The Spanish commander of the Citadel of Antwerp, Sancho d'Avila, had the idea to sack Antwerp. He tried to convince the commander of the German troops in the city, Count Otto IV van Eberstein, son of William IV of Eberstein, to deliver the city to the Spanish.

However, Eberstein warned Governor Compagny (or Champagny) of Antwerp, and together, they improvised defences against the Spanish. On 3 November, Compagny let a force of 6,000 Walloon troops under Charles Philippe de Croÿ into the city. That was a risk because these troops were not very trustworthy. Some 10,000 civilians also helped to raise improvised defences against the Citadel. D'Avila had also prepared his attack and contacted other Spanish mutinous troops in Aalst, Lier, Breda and Maastricht, which converged on the city.

On 4 November at 11:00, the Spanish attacked. The civilian defenses were useless against the battle-hardened Spaniards, who swarmed into the city. As had been feared, the Walloons did not fight but fled or even participated in the looting, according to different sources. The Germans and civilians tried to resist but were no match for the Spaniards. Eberstein drowned in the Scheldt when he tried to escape.

At least 7,000 lives and a great deal of property were lost. The deaths were assessed at 17,000 by George Gascoigne, an English writer who was a witness. The cruelty and the destruction of the three days of pillage became known as the Spanish Fury.

== Consequences ==
This shocking event stiffened many in the Netherlands, even many Catholics, against the Spanish Habsburg monarchy and further tarnished Philip's declining reputation. The States General, influenced by the sack, signed the Pacification of Ghent only four days later, unifying the rebellious provinces with the loyal provinces to remove all Spanish soldiers from the Netherlands, as well as stop the persecution of heretics. This effectively destroyed every accomplishment the Spanish had made in the past 10 years since the Dutch Revolt started.

Furthermore, it brought about the ruin of the Antwerp Cloth Market. English traders, not wishing to risk visiting a town that now resembled a war zone, sought out new commercial links. By 1582, all English trade to Antwerp had ceased. The city's large Jewish population was especially hard hit. Antwerp subsequently lost its status as one of Europe's most prosperous, influential cities; it recovered but was never to recapture its former glory.

The sack led to Antwerp's decline from the Netherlands' economic, financial, and cultural center and paved the way for Amsterdam's rise.

This event also added to Spain's Black Legend.

== See also ==
- Spanish Fury at Mechelen
- English Fury at Mechelen
- French Fury
- Sack of Rome (1527), when unpaid Imperial troops looted Rome.

== Sources ==
- The Baldwin Project
- University of Leiden
