= Naarderbos =

- Recreational area / hamlet
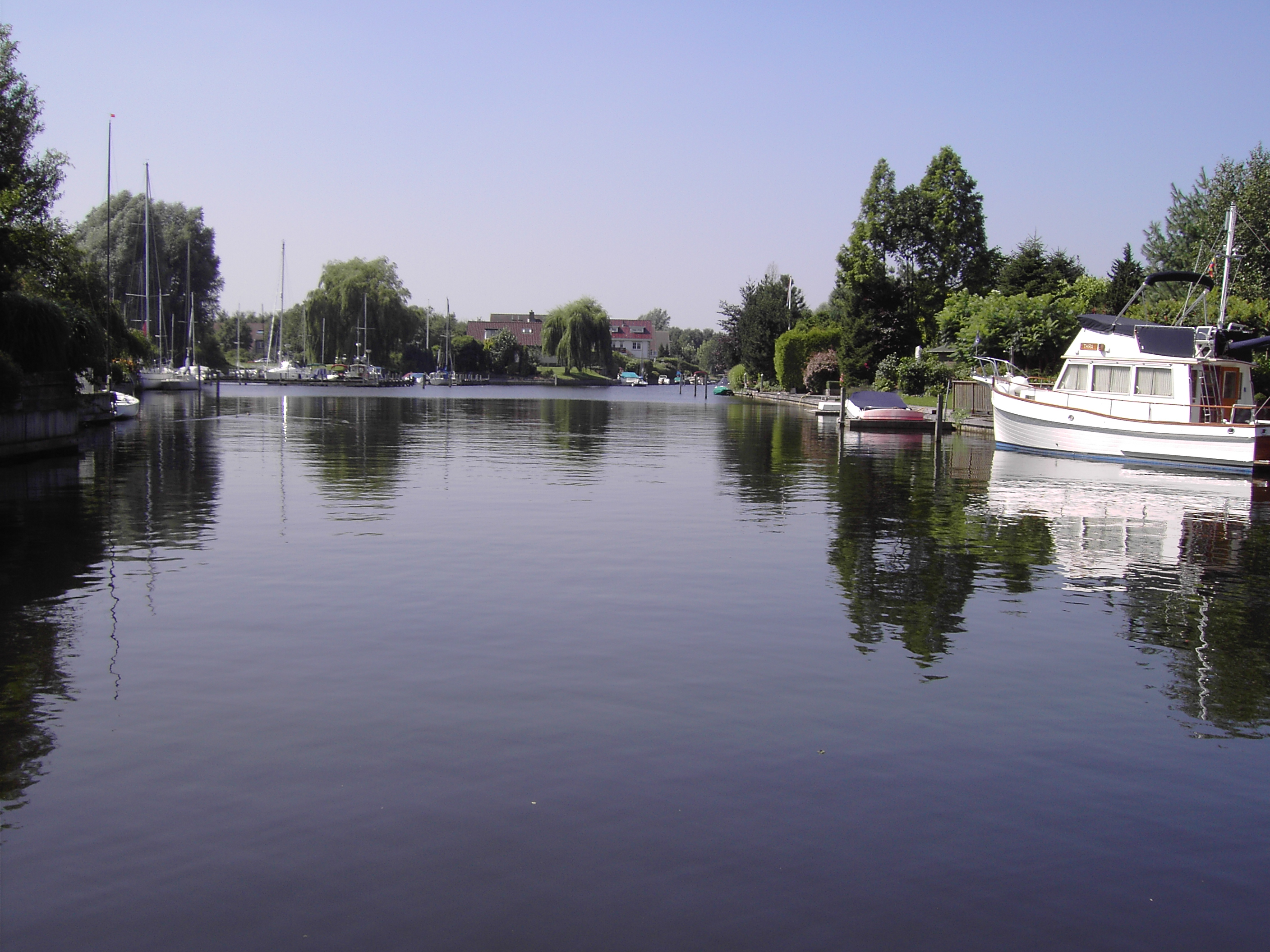
- Naarderwoonbos

- Location in the Netherlands Location in the province of North Holland in the Netherlands
- Coordinates: 52°18′32″N 5°9′07″E
- Country: Netherlands
- Province: North Holland
- Municipality: Dijk en Waard

Area
  - Total: 0.55 km^{2} (0.21 sq mi)
- Elevation: 1.2 m (3.9 ft)

Population (2021)
  - Total: 460
  - Density: 840/km^{2} (2,200/sq mi)
- Time zone: UTC+1 (CET)
  - Summer (DST): UTC+2 (CEST)
- Postal code: 1411
- Dialing code: 035

Naarderbos is a recreational area in the Gooi region in the province of North Holland in the Netherlands. It is situated on the shores of the Gooimeerlake and is part of the city of Naarden. It consists partly of woodland and meadows and has a villa closed community also referred to as "Naarderwoonbos". This community consists of approx. 180 villas, which each having its own boat pier as well as a public 18 hole golf course.

A beach was created and 3 urban villas were erected during 2007. The Naarderbos is a forest that was planted in 1980. It is a recreation park and some facilities such as golf and beaches are available. The Naarderbos consists mostly of oak, chestnut and beech-wood trees and it has many paths for walking, as well as picnic areas. The Naarderbos is about 20 km southeast of Amsterdam. Naarderbos also has a wild variety of animals. There have been sightings of moles, snakes, ferrets and a variety of bird species. There is a family of storks that live there and visit during the summer and there is also an overpopulated species of wild brown rabbits. There is also a hotel located nearby, only about 550 meters away from the new beach.

== Gallery ==
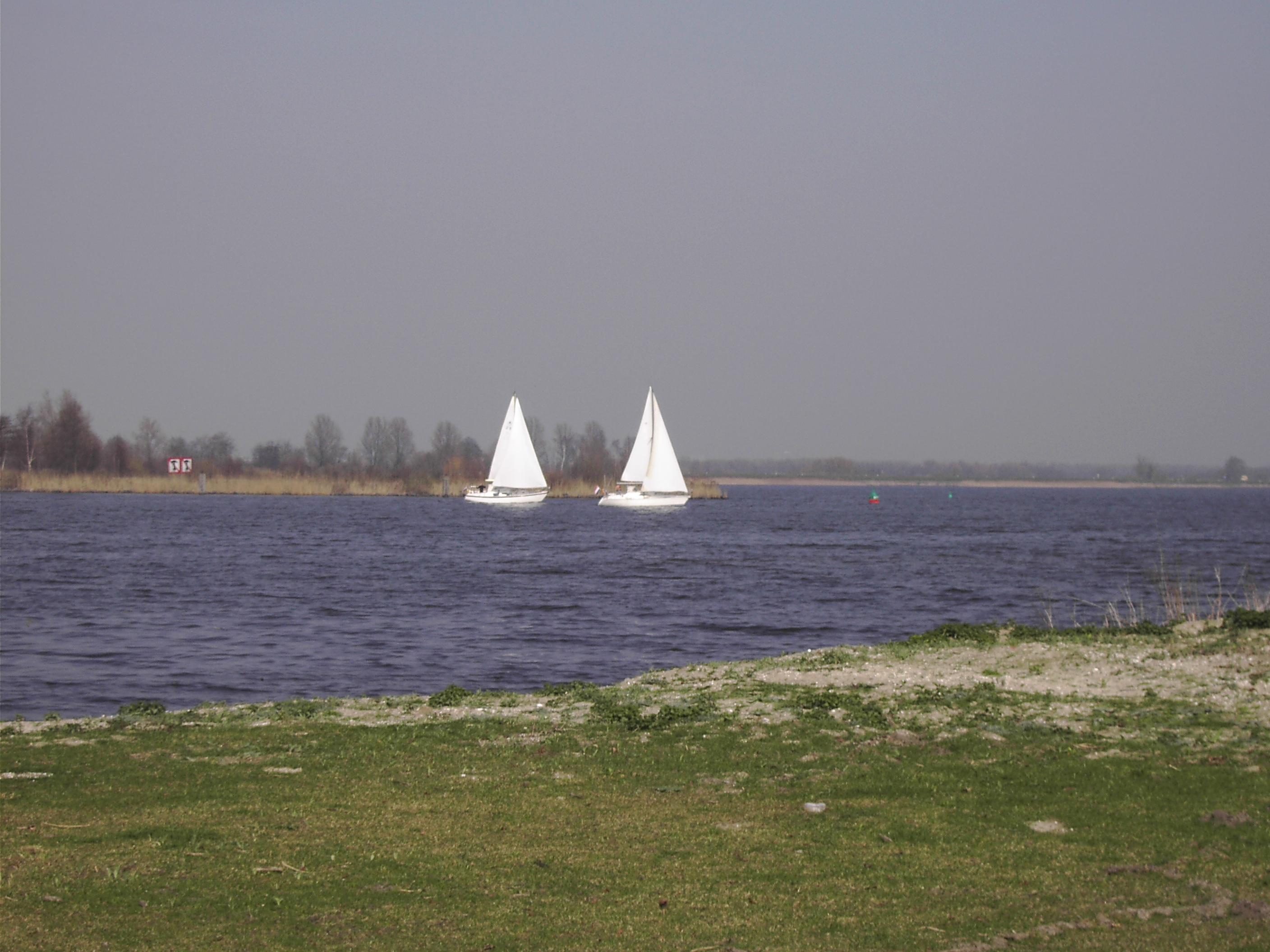
Gooimeer lake

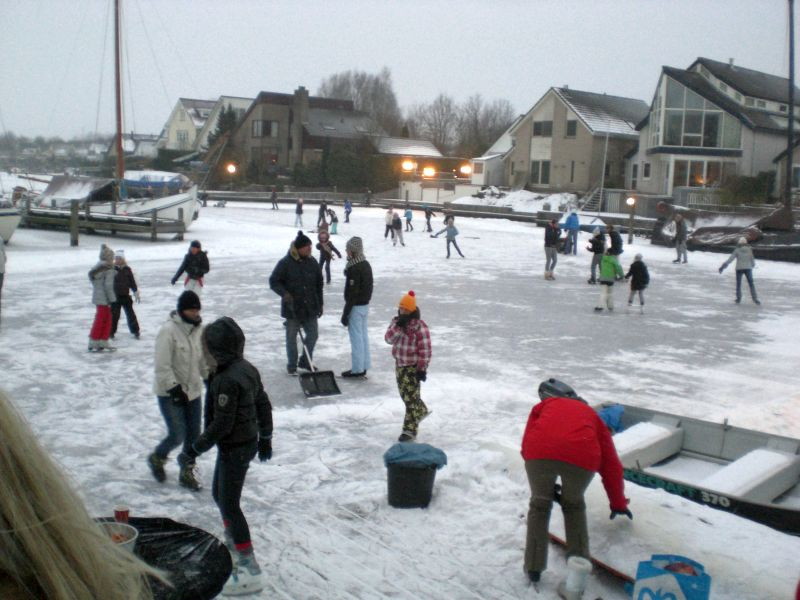
Ice skating in Naarderbos
