= 1280s =

Decade

The 1280s is the decade starting January 1, 1280 and ending December 31, 1289.

== Events ==
=== 1280 ===
- June 23 – Reconquista: Battle of Moclín – Troops of the Emirate of Granada defeat those of the Kingdom of Castile and Kingdom of León.
- September 27 – King Magnus Ladulås of Sweden founds a Swedish nobility by enacting a law accepting a contribution of a cavalry member in lieu of ordinary tax payments.
- Tsar Ivan Asen III of Bulgaria flees from Tarnovo, ending the Asen dynasty in Bulgaria.
- Syria attempts to secede from the Mamluk Sultanate of Egypt, but Al Mansur Qalawun defeats the rebels and keeps Syria within the Egyptian sultanate.
- Turin is conquered by Thomas III of Savoy, becoming the capital of the House of Savoy.
- Construction on the northern section of the Grand Canal of China has begun.
- The final expansion of Lincoln Cathedral in England is completed.
- The second of two main surveys of the Hundred Rolls, an English census seen as a follow-up to the Domesday Book (completed in 1086), is finished; it began in 1279.
- Approximate date
  - The ancestors of the Māori people from eastern Polynesia become the first human settlers of New Zealand.
  - The Wolf minimum of solar activity begins.

=== 1281 ===
==== By place ====
====== Byzantine Empire ======
- Spring – Siege of Berat: A Byzantine relief force under Michael Tarchaneiotes arrives at the strategically important citadel of Berat. Tarchaneiotes avoids a confrontation with the Angevines and relies on ambushes and raids instead. He manages to capture the Angevin commander, Hugh of Sully, a few of Sully's guards escape and reach their camp – where they report his capture. Panic spreads among the Angevin troops at this news and they begin to flee towards Avlon. The Byzantines take advantage of their disordered flight and attacks, joined by the troops in the besieged citadel. Tarchaneiotes takes an enormous booty, a small remnant of the Angevin army manages to cross the Vjosa River and reach the safety of Kanina.
- October 18 – Emperor Michael VIII (Palaiologos) is excommunicated by Pope Martin IV without any warning or provocation. Martin authorizes Charles I, king of Sicily, to make a Crusade against Michael, who has re-established his rule in Constantinople. Charles prepares an expedition in Sicily and assembles a fleet of 100 ships, and 300 more in Naples, Provence, and the Greek territories, which carry some 8,000 cavalrymen.

====== Europe ======
- June – Castilian forces led King Alfonso X (the Wise) and accompanied by his sons, the Infantes Sancho, Peter and John, invade the lowlands of Granada. Sultan Muhammad II sends a Moorish army, supported by many archers and cavalry, to repel them. Alfonso defeats the Moors in a battle near Granada's walls on June 25, but after the failure of the negotiations that follow, he leaves Granada.
- July 3 – Treaty of Orvieto: Charles I, Giovanni Dandolo, doge of Venice, and Philip I, Latin emperor, make an agreement to recover the Latin Empire. The treaty is signed in the Papal Palace, which Martin IV has moved to Orvieto after Viterbo is placed under an interdict for imprisoning two cardinals.

====== Middle East ======
- September – Two Mongol armies (some 50,000 men) advance into Syria. One, is commanded by Abaqa Khan – who attacks the Mamluk fortresses along the Euphrates frontier. The second one, led by his brother Möngke Temür makes contact with Leo III, king of Cilician Armenia, and then marches down through Aintab and Aleppo into the Orontes valley. Where he is joined by knights of the Hospitaller Order and some French mercenaries. Meanwhile, Sultan Qalawun assembles his Mamluk forces at Damascus.
- October 29 – Battle of Homs: In a pitched battle, Mamluk forces (some 30,000 men) led by Qalawun destroy the Mongol center, Möngke Temür is wounded and flees. He orders a retreat, followed by a disorganized army. The Armenian-Georgian auxiliaries under Leo III fight their way back northwards. The Mongol army recrosses the Euphrates without losses, the river remains the frontier between the Mongols and the Mamluk Sultanate.
- Osman I, founder of the Ottoman Empire, becomes bey of the Söğüt tribe in central Anatolia after the death of his father, Ertuğrul Ghazi. Osman's accession to power is not peaceful, as he has to fight his relatives before he gets hold of the clan's leadership. One of Osman's major rivals is his uncle Dündar Bey, who rebels against him.

====== Asia ======
- August 15 – Battle of Kōan (or Second Battle of Hakata Bay): A second Mongol invasion of Japan is foiled, as a large typhoon – famously called a kamikaze, or divine wind – destroys much of the combined Mongol and Chinese fleet and forces, numbering over 140,000 men and 4,000 ships. Later, Kublai Khan begins to gather forces to prepare for a third invasion attempt, but is distracted by events in Southeast and Central Asia.
- Kublai Khan orders the burning of sacred Taoist texts, resulting in the reduction in number of volumes of the Daozang (Taoist Canon) from 4,565 to 1,120.
- The Mon Kingdom of Hariphunchai falls, as its capital Lamphun (in modern-day Thailand) is captured by King Mangrai's Lannathai Kingdom.

==== By topic ====
====== Markets ======
- Guy of Dampierre, count of Flanders, licenses the first Lombard merchants to open a changing business in his realm.

====== Religion ======
- February 22 – Frenchman Simon de Brion succeeds Nicholas III, as Martin IV, and becomes the 189th pope of the Catholic Church.

=== 1282 ===
==== By place ====
====== Europe ======
- March – Welsh forces under Prince Dafydd ap Gruffydd, brother of Llywelyn ap Gruffudd, attack and take control of Hawarden Castle. The garrison is massacred and Constable Roger de Clifford is taken prisoner. Llywelyn who has sworn fealty to King Edward I (Longshanks), joins Dafydd in his revolt against the English. Their actions lead to the final English conquest of Wales, by Edward.
- March 30 – War of the Sicilian Vespers: A group of Sicilian conspirators begins an uprising against the rule of King Charles I; over the next six weeks, thousands of French are killed. The rebellion forces Charles to abandon the planned crusade against the Byzantines, while still en route to the target city of Constantinople and allows King Peter III (the Great) to take over rule of the island from Charles (which in turn leads to Peter's excommunication by Pope Martin IV).
- May 1 – Battle of Forlì: A French expeditionary army under Jean d'Eppe launches an assault on Forlì and breaches the outer wall. While they plunder the suburbs, Guido I da Montefeltro sends a small force out the gate on the opposite side of the city. In an ambush, Guelph and Ghibelline forces defeat the main army of d'Eppe, who is forced to retreat to Faenza. He requests Martin IV for more reinforcements, but this is refused.
- Summer – An Aragonese expeditionary army under Peter III lands in North Africa in Collo, in proclaimed support of a rebellion of the governor of Constantine, Ibn Wazir. The revolt is suppressed by Abu Ishaq Ibrahim I, ruler of the Hafsid Sultanate. Peter, wary of the situation in Sicily, sails off and fails to take advantage of the state of rebellion in North Africa. Ibrahim stabilizes his power and styles himself emir of the sultanate.
- June – The 24-year-old Prince Sancho, heir to the throne of Castile, assembles a coalition of nobles and starts a massive rebellion against his father, King Alfonso X (the Wise). He dispatches his brothers into the realm to claim strategically important cities and castles. Only the cities of Seville, Murcia, and Badajoz remain loyal to Alfonso, who becomes isolated politically and abandoned by most of his family.
- June 17 – Battle of Llandeilo Fawr: English forces led by Gilbert de Clare are ambushed and defeated by Welsh troops at Llandeilo. English expansion into southern Wales is halted.
- June 26 – King Denis I (the Poet King) marries the 11-year-old Elizabeth of Aragon, daughter of Peter III (the Great), in Trancoso. Elizabeth received the towns of Óbidos, Abrantes, and Porto de Mós as part of her dowry. Denis, known for his poetry, writes several poems and books himself, with topics of administration and hunting. During his reign, Lisbon becomes one of Europe's centers of art and culture.
- July – Alfonso X (the Wise) allies himself with Abu Yusuf Yaqub ibn Abd al-Haqq, ruler of the Marinid Sultanate, who crosses the straits, and establishes a camp at Zahara de la Sierra, in southern Spain. Alfonso offers the Castilian royal crown of his father and grandfathers as a pledge of re-payment of a loan. Out of pity, Abu Yusuf gives him 100,000 gold dinars.
- August – Castilian forces under Sancho lay siege to Badajoz, who eventually retreat as the combined armies of Alfonso X (the Wise) relieve the city. Shortly after, Alfonso marches to Córdoba and demands the key of the city. This is refused by Diego López V de Haro, speaking on behalf of the magnates. Meanwhile, the Marinids plunder the Guadalquivir valley.
- August 30 – Peter III (the Great) traveling with his fleet on a military expedition against Tunis, ends up in the Sicilian town of Trapani, after he was asked by the inhabitants of Palermo to help in the fight against Charles I.
- September 4 – Peter III (the Great) is proclaimed "King of Sicily". Charles is forced to flee across the Strait of Messina, only to be content with the Kingdom of Naples (ruling a part of the Italian Peninsula with Martin IV).
- September or October – Battle of Lake Hód: Hungarian forces led by King Ladislaus IV successfully repel and defeat an invading Cuman army. Ladislaus receives the title "the Cuman" for his heroic victory.
- November – Castilian forces under Alfonso X (the Wise) reconquer Córdoba. Pope Martin IV issues a papal bull, forcing Sancho and his nobles to proclaim their allegiance to Alfonso ending the rebellion.
- November 6 – Battle of Moel-y-don: English forces led by Luke de Tany are ambushed and defeated by Welsh troops, while crossing over a floating bridge to the island of Anglesey.
- December 11 – Battle of Orewin Bridge: English forces (some 6,000 men) under Edward I (Longshanks) defeat a Welsh army near Cilmeri. Llywelyn ap Gruffudd is killed.
- December 27 – King Rudolf I invests his sons, Albert I and Rudolf II, as co-rulers of the duchies of Austria and Styria, and lays the foundation of the House of Habsburg in these territories.
- Dutch forces led by Floris V, count of Holland, attack and defeat the West Frisians at the battle of Vronen. He succeeds in retrieving the body of his father, William II, some 26 years dead.
- King Stefan Dragutin breaks his leg while hunting and becomes ill. He abdicates the throne in favor of his younger brother, Stefan Milutin, who becomes ruler of Serbia (until 1321).
- Peter III (the Great) obtains the support of Nasrid Granada preparing for the incoming Aragonese Crusade, led by Philip the Fair of France.
- Daniel of Moscow, youngest son of Alexander Nevsky, is mentioned during this year as an independent Prince of the Grand Duchy of Moscow. This Duchy will be a vassal state of the Golden Horde until 1471, later evolving into the Tsardom of Russia.

==== By topic ====
====== Education ======
- Hertford College is founded, at the University of Oxford.

====== Markets ======
- The form for the Trial of the Pyx, during which it is confirmed that newly minted coins conform to required standards, is established.
- The first evidence is discovered of the existence of consolidated public debt in Bruges, confirming the expansion of use of annuities, to fund government expenditure to the Low Countries.

====== Nature ======
- The most recent eruption of Larderello, observed, at Boracifero crater lake in southern Tuscany.

====== Technology ======
- The technology of watermarks is introduced by paper manufacturers of Bologna, Italy.

====== Religion ======
- John Peckham, archbishop of Canterbury, orders all the synagogues of London to close, and forbids Jewish doctors from practicing on non-Jews.
- Construction of Albi Cathedral in Languedoc begins.

=== 1283 ===
==== By place ====
====== Europe ======
- June 1 – Treaty of Rheinfelden: The 11-year-old Rudolf II is forced to relinquish his claim on the Duchies of Austria and Styria to his elder brother, Albert I. According to the terms of the agreement, concluded at the Imperial City of Rheinfelden (modern Switzerland), Rudolf receives some territories in Further Austria in return.
- June 29 – Sultan Abu Yusuf Yaqub ibn Abd al-Haqq sets out for a punitive expedition and marches from Córdoba to Jaén and Úbeda, and then northwards through difficult terrain. On the third day after crossing al-burt, the Marinid forces attack Montiel (a fortress belonging to the Order of Santiago) and Almedina.
- July 8 – Battle of Malta: An Aragonese fleet (some 20 galleys) under Admiral Roger of Lauria attacks and defeats the Angevin ships in the Grand Harbour, sent to help put down a rebellion on Malta. Lauria lands his troops at the harbour and after two days raises his banner on the fortified city of Mdina ("Old City").
- The first regulated Catalan Courts are reunited by King Peter III, for the whole Principality of Catalonia. It became one of the first medieval parliaments that bans the royal power to create legislation unilaterally.
- King Philip III of France ("the Bold") outlaws Jews from residence in the small villages and rural localities of France, causing a mass migration.
- An earthquake destroys two thirds of the cave city of Vardzia, Georgia.

====== British Isles ======
- January 2 – Most of Dublin, including St. Patrick's Cathedral, is burned in a fire.
- January 18 – King Edward I of England ("Longshanks") captures Dolwyddelan Castle in North Wales from the Welsh.
- April 25 – The last independent Welsh stronghold, Castell y Bere, is surrendered by Cynfrig ap Madog to the English.
- June 28 – A parliament of England summoned by Edward I to assemble at Shrewsbury Abbey to decide the fate of the Welsh prince Dafydd ap Gruffydd (captured on June 22) is the first to include commoners.
- October 3 – The last ruler of an independent Wales, Dafydd ap Gruffydd (David), Prince of Wales, is executed in Shrewsbury, the first prominent person in history to be hanged, drawn and quartered, as capital punishment for the newly created crime of high treason (against Edward I of England).
- Castles and Town Walls of King Edward in Gwynedd: Construction of Caernarfon Castle, Conwy Castle and Harlech Castle in Wales by Edward I of England begins as a system of defenses against possible future Welsh uprisings.

====== Levant ======
- June – Qalawun ("the Victorious"), Mamluk ruler of Egypt, signs a peace treaty for 10 years with the Crusader States at Caesarea. It guarantees the Crusaders the possession of the territory from the Ladder of Tyre, north of Acre, to Mount Carmel and Atlit. But Tyre and Beirut are excluded. The right of free pilgrimage to Nazareth is permitted for the Christians.

====== Africa ======
- Abu Ishaq Ibrahim I, ruler of the Hafsid Sultanate, is overthrown by the Bedouin rebellion, led by Abd al-Aziz I.

====== Asia ======
- February 13–14 – Battle of Thị Nại Bay: A Mongol-led Yuan expeditionary force (some 5,000 men) lands on the beach, near Champa's capital Vijaya in Vietnam. Despite being outnumbered, the Yuan invaders break the Cham defensive line and force King Indravarman V to retreat to the Western Highlands, where he wages a successful guerrilla campaign against the occupying Yuan forces.
- Mongol invasion of Burma: Mongol forces besiege the fortress at Ngasaunggyan on September 23. The Burmese garrison withstands the siege for two months, but finally falls to the invaders on December 3. The defeat breaks the morale of the Burmese defenses. Kaungsin, the next fortress in line, falls just six days later.
- Mongol forces invade the Khmer Empire (modern Cambodia). King Jayavarman VIII decides to pay tribute rather than fight the invasion, buying peace and preserving the empire.
- Ram Khamhaeng, ruler of the Sukhothai Kingdom, creates the Thai alphabet during his reign (approximate date).

==== By topic ====
====== The arts, culture and literature ======
- The Libro de los juegos, an early European treatise on board games (including chess, dice, and a version of backgammon), is commissioned by King Alfonso X of Castile ("the Wise") (approximate date).
- Ramon Llull, Spanish theologian, writes Blanquerna, the first major work of literature written in Catalan, and perhaps the first European novel.

====== Markets ======
- The German city of Goslar starts making efforts to redeem its already issued annuities, a sure indication of financial difficulty, and maybe an early sign of the 13th century crisis.

=== 1284 ===
==== By place ====
====== Europe ======
- Aragonese Crusade: The first French armies under King Philip III ("the Bold") and his 14-year-old son Charles of Valois enter Roussillon. They include 16,000 cavalry, 17,000 crossbowmen, and 100,000 infantry, along with 100 ships in south French ports. Though they have the support of James II, ruler of Majorca, the local populace rises against them. Elne is valiantly defended by Aragonese troops, but the French occupy the city, and burn the cathedral, while the population is massacred.
- April 4 – King Alfonso X of Castile ("the Wise") falls ill and dies after a 32-year reign at Seville. He is succeeded by his 25-year-old son Sancho IV ("the Brave") who becomes ruler of Castile and León. Meanwhile, his nephew, Alfonso de la Cerda, challenges his right to the Castilian throne. Pope Martin IV excommunicates Sancho, places an interdict on his kingdom and refuses to acknowledge the marriage to his cousin, Queen María de Molina.
- June 5 – Battle of the Gulf of Naples: An Aragonese-Sicilian fleet (some 30 galleys) led by Admiral Roger of Lauria surrounds and defeats the Neapolitan ships in the Gulf of Naples. King Charles II of Naples ("the Lame") is captured during the battle; disorganized, the remnants of the Neapolitan fleet (between 15 and 18 galleys) flee back to Naples.
- August 5–6 – Battle of Meloria: A Genoese fleet (some 90 galleys) led by Admiral Oberto Doria defeats the Pisan ships in the Ligurian Sea. This marks the decline of the maritime power of Pisa in the Mediterranean.
- King Rudolf I imposes a trade embargo on Norway, due to the latter pillaging a German ship. The embargo cuts off vital supplies of grain, flour, vegetables and beer, causing a general famine in Norway.
- The events giving rise to the story of the Pied Piper of Hamelin take place in Lower Saxony.

====== British Isles ======
- March 3 – Statute of Rhuddlan: King Edward I of England brings Wales under direct rule after the Welsh Wars (1277–1283). He appoints sheriffs and bailiffs for the northern territories while the southern areas are left under the control of the Marcher Lords. English law is introduced in criminal cases, though the Welsh are allowed to maintain their customary laws in some cases of property disputes. He arranges a Round Table (tournament) at Nefyn in Wales and promises the Welsh that he will provide them with a Prince of Wales. On April 25, his son, the future Edward II of England, is born at Caernarfon Castle in Wales.

====== Africa ======
- Hafsid forces under Abu Hafs Umar bin Yahya (half-brother of Abu Ishaq Ibrahim I) reconquer Tunis and reinstall the Hafsid dynasty as the dominating power in Ifriqiya. This ends the Bedouin rebellion started in 1283.
- King Peter III of Aragon takes advantage of the weakness of the Hafsid dynasty and raids the island of Djerba. Aragonese forces massacre the population and occupy the island.

==== By topic ====
====== Art and culture ======
- Construction of Beauvais Cathedral is interrupted by a partial collapse of the choir; the event unnerves French masons working in the Gothic style.
- Jean de Meun, French poet and writer, translates Vegetius' 4th century military treatise De Re Militari from Latin into French.

====== Cities and towns ======
- May 18 – Jönköping in Sweden is granted town privileges by King Magnus Ladulås.

====== Education ======
- Peterhouse, oldest collegiate foundation of the University of Cambridge in England, is established by Bishop Hugh de Balsham.

====== Health ======
- The Al-Mansuri bimaristan (hospital) is completed in Cairo.

====== Markets ======
- The Republic of Venice begins coining the ducat, a gold coin that is to become the standard of European coinage, for the following 600 years.

=== 1285 ===
==== By place ====
====== Europe ======
- Aragonese Crusade: French forces led by King Philip III (the Bold) entrench before Girona, in an attempt to besiege the city. Despite strong resistance, the city is eventually taken on September 7. Philip's son, the 15-year-old Charles of Valois, is crowned as king of Aragon (under the vassalage of the Holy See) but without an actual crown. Shortly after, the French camp is racked by an epidemic of dysentery and Philip is forced to retreat.
- April – Marinid forces under Sultan Abu Yusuf Yaqub ibn Abd al-Haqq cross the straits from Alcácer Seguir to Tarifa. From there they advance to Jerez de la Frontera, where they besiege the city. Marinids detachments are dispatched to devastate a broad area from Medina-Sidonia to Carmona, Vejer de la Frontera, Écija and Seville, cutting down trees, orchards, and vineyards, destroying villages, and killing or capturing many inhabitants.
- May – King Sancho IV (the Brave) assembles his army at Seville and sends the Castilian fleet (some 100 ships) led by Admiral Benedetto I Zaccaria to blockade the mouth of the Guadalquivir River. Meanwhile, a Marinid detachment of 1,000 cavalry moves against Seville, routing the Castilians send out to oppose them. Turning eastward against Carmona and Alcalá de Guadaíra, the Marinids burn the suburbs, harvest and ruin orchards.
- May 22 – Marinid forces under Abu Yusuf Yaqub ibn Abd al-Haqq prolong their siege at Jerez de la Frontera. He sends his son Abu Yaqub Yusuf an-Nasr with 5,000 regulars, 2,000 cavalry, some 13,000 infantry and 2,000 archers to raid Seville and its environs on June 1. During June and early July, the Marinids assault daily Jerez while raiding parties pillage the countryside at Carmona, Niebla, Écija, Seville and Sanlúcar de Barrameda.
- August – Castilian forces led by Sancho IV (the Brave) march against the Marinids at Jerez de la Frontera. Meanwhile, Abu Yusuf Yaqub ibn Abd al-Haqq with his army of 18,000 cavalry and faced with dwindling supplies, decides to lift the siege after five months, on August 2. He withdraws his army to the safety of Algeciras and opens negotiations with Sancho while the Castilian fleet arrives at El Puerto de Santa Maria (or "The port of Saint Mary").
- September 4 – Battle of Les Formigues: An Aragonese-Sicilian fleet (some 40 galleys) under Admiral Roger of Lauria defeats French and Genoese ships near the Formigues Islands. According to Johan Esteve de Bezers, a French troubadour, all prisoners but one have their eyes gouged out, and that one is left with one eye to guide the others. After the battle, Roger captures about 15 to 20 French galleys, and others are sunk or burnt.
- October 1 – Battle of the Col de Panissars: Aragonese forces under King Peter III (the Great) ambush and defeat a French expeditionary army while it was retreating over the Pyrenees. The French troops are massacred by the Aragonese vanguard at the Panissar Pass, but spared the royal family. Philip III (the Bold) arrives with his fatigued remnants in Perpignan, where he dies of dysentery on October 5.
- November 2 – Peter III (the Great) dies after a 9-year reign at Vilafranca del Penedès. He is succeeded by his 20-year-old son Alfonso III (the Liberal), who becomes king of Aragon. Peter's other son James II (the Just), is crowned ruler of Sicily. His third son, the 13-year-old Frederick, becomes co-ruler and regent of Sicily.
- Winter – The Mongol Golden Horde led by Nogai Khan and Talabuga attacks Hungary for the second time. They successfully subdue Slovakia and sack territory north of the Carpathian Mountains.

====== England ======
- The Second Statute of Westminster is accepted in parliament, reforming various laws; it includes the clause de donis conditionalibus, considered one of the fundamental institutes of medieval law.
- The writ Circumspecte Agatis, issued by King Edward I (Longshanks), defines the jurisdictions of church and state, thereby limiting the church's judicial powers to ecclesiastical cases only.

====== Levant ======
- April 17 – Mamluk forces under Sultan Qalawun (the Victorious) appear with specially built war engines before the Crusader fortress of Margat and begin a siege. For a month, the Mamluks can make no progress and the assaults on the stronghold are repelled. Qalawun then invites a delegation of Knights Hospitaller to come and see the damage his engineers have done to the 'impregnable' fortifications. They understood they have no real choice and are forced to surrender on May 25. The Hospitallers are allowed to retire with all their possessions, on horseback and fully armed. The rest of the garrison is promised a safe-conduct to Tortosa – while Qalawun establishes a Mamluk garrison which he uses as a basis for further campaigns against the Crusader States.

====== Asia ======
- June 24 – Battle of Chương Dương: Joint forces of Champa and Đại Việt defeat the Mongol-led Yuan fleet on the Red River. Most of the Yuan warships are burned during the battle, and the Mongol army retreats to China in late June. The Vietnamese royal court returns to the capital in Thang Long following a six-month conflict.

==== By topic ====
====== Art and Culture ======
- The English romantic poem The Lay of Havelok the Dane is written (approximate date).

====== Markets ======
- The first record is made of an emission of life annuities, by the city of Lübeck. It is the first instance of issue of public debt in Germany, and it confirms a trend of consolidation of local public debt over north-western Europe (see 1228).
- The County of Champagne is integrated into the kingdom of France; the region loses its haven characteristics for foreign merchants, and the Fairs of Troyes quickly dwindle into economic insignificance.

====== Religion ======
- January 6 – Archbishop Jakub Świnka organizes a synod in Łęczyca. During the meeting, he orders all priests who are subject to his bishopric to deliver their sermons in Polish rather than German. This further unifies the Catholic Church in Poland and fosters a national identity.
- March 25 – Pope Martin IV dies after a 4-year pontificate in Perugia. He is succeeded by Honorius IV, who becomes the 190th pope of the Catholic Church.
- Council of Blachernae: The Eastern Orthodox Church repudiates the Union with the Catholic Church, declared in the Second Council of Lyon.
- The Mor Bar Sauma Monastery, one of the most important monasteries of the Syriac Orthodox Church, is destroyed. Though a monastic community remains, the patriarchal seat is moved to Sis.

=== 1286 ===
==== By place ====
====== Europe ======
- January 6 – The 17-year-old Philip IV (the Fair) is crowned king of France at Reims. He settles the Aragonese conflict (see 1285), and intensifies his predecessors' efforts to reform and rationalize the administration of the realm. Philip persists in reforms, which strengthen the monarchy's position in Europe. The gabelle – a tax on salt in the form of a state monopoly – will become immensely unpopular and grossly unequal, but persist until 1790.
- March 20 – Sultan Abu Yusuf Yaqub ibn Abd al-Haqq dies after a 28-year reign at Algeciras. He is succeeded by his son Abu Yaqub Yusuf an-Nasr, who becomes ruler of the Marinid Sultanate. Abu Yaqub makes a peace agreement with Muhammad II, Nasrid ruler of Granada, ceding all the towns previously occupied (except Algeciras and Tarifa). After confirming the peace with Castile on May 28, he leaves 3,000 men in the Peninsula.
- Old Prussians resettle in Samland and start an uprising against Teutonic rule (supported by the Principality of Rügen). The Prussians are defeated by the Teutonic Knights and forced to submit.
- The War of the Donkey is fought between the rival noble families of the Ghisi and the Sanudo, in the Duchy of the Archipelago in the Aegean Sea.
- The Guelph Republic of Siena allows exiled Ghibelline rebels back into the city.

====== England & Scotland ======
- March 19 – King Alexander III dies in a fall from his horse at Kinghorn in Fife, leaving Queen Yolande of Dreux's unborn child and the 3-year-old Margaret (Maid of Norway) as heirs to the throne. After Alexander's death, Scotland is governed by the nobility and clergy, known collectively as the Guardians of Scotland. This sets the stage for the First War of Scottish Independence.
- June – King Edward I (Longshanks) and Queen Eleanor of Castile travel to France. There they pay homage to Philip IV (the Fair) and attend to other matters. Edward travels around in the duchy of Gascony and orders the rebuilding of fortifications in the region (between 1286 and 1289).

====== Levant ======
- June 4 – The 15-year-old Henry II sails from Cyprus and lands in Acre, but is refused entry into the citadel. There, he stays for six weeks in the palace to negotiate an agreement to take over the city from the Angevins.
- August 15 – Henry II is crowned king of Jerusalem at Tyre. After the ceremony, he returns to Acre for the festivities. A few weeks later, Henry returns to Cyprus and appoints his uncle Philip of Ibelin as regent (bailiff).

====== Africa ======
- Abu Hafs Umar I, ruler of the Hafsid Sultanate, takes control of Béjaïa and becomes a rival of the main Hafsid entity based in Tunis.

====== Asia ======
- In the Lao kingdom of Muang Sua, King Panya Leng is overthrown in a coup d'état led by his son, Prince Panya Khamphong, which is likely to have been supported by the Mongol-led Yuan Dynasty in China.
- Kublai Khan makes plans for a final Mongol invasion of Japan, but aborts the preparations due to a lack of necessary resources.

==== By topic ====
====== Art and Culture ======
- March 7 – The Catholicon, a religious Latin dictionary, is completed by John of Genoa.

=== 1287 ===
==== By place ====
====== Europe ======
- January 17 – Aragonese forces led by King Alfonso III (the Liberal) conquer the island of Menorca. He signs the "Treaty of San Agayz" with Sultan Abû 'Umar ibn Sa'îd on January 21. Alfonso accepts a policy of free trade for merchants and their property. He also concludes an alliance against the Marinids with Abu Said Uthman I, ruler of the Zayyanid Kingdom of Tlemcen (modern Algeria). He proposes to supply him with five to ten galleys (with food and other goods) in exchange for 500 elite Zayyanid horsemen.
- Alfonso III (the Liberal) is forced to make concessions to the nobility after an aristocratic uprising (called the Union of Aragon). In particular, he grants his barons a "Bill of Rights", known as the Privilegium Generale. This leaves a heritage of disunity and further dissent among the nobility, who increasingly see little reason to respect the throne, and brings the Crown of Aragon to the point of anarchy. Alfonso, who is not pleased with the anti-royalist movement, is forced to accept the Magna Carta (Great Charter).
- June – Rabban Bar Sauma, Chinese Nestorian monk and diplomat, travels from Constantinople to Italy. There he arrives in Naples and witnesses a sea battle in the harbour between the Aragonese and the Angevin fleets. Bar Sauma goes to Rome, but arrives too late to meet Pope Honorius IV, who recently died. He instead is engaged in negotiations with the cardinals, who are in a conclave to elect a successor, and visits the St. Peter's Basilica. Bar Sauma goes to Genoa, where he receives a warm welcome.
- June 23 – Battle of the Counts: An Aragonese-Sicilian fleet (some 50 galleys) under Admiral Roger of Lauria defeat a larger Angevin fleet of 70 galleys near Naples. After a feigned retreat, Roger attacks the Angevin galleys from all sides. During the battle, which last much of the day, the Angevin fleet is scattered, leaving about 40 galleys to be captured, along with 5,000 prisoners. After the victory, without any authorization from King James II, Roger makes a truce with the Neapolitans (who are allies of the Angevins).
- September – Rabban Bar Sauma arrives in Paris, and is received in an audience by King Philip IV (the Fair). He spends one month at the royal court, during his stay, Philip himself escorts him around the Sainte-Chapelle (or Holy Chapel) to see the collection of Passion relics by late King Louis IX (the Saint). Philip gives Bar Sauma many presents and sends one of his noblemen, Gobert de Helleville, to return with him to Mongol lands. In response, he attempts to form a military alliance with France and England.
- December 14 – A huge storm and associated storm tide in the North Sea and English Channel, known as St. Lucia's flood in the Netherlands, kills thousands and reshapes the coastline of the Netherlands and England. In the Netherlands, a fringing barrier between the North Sea and a shallow lake collapses, causing the fifth-largest flood in recorded history – which creates the Zuider Zee inlet, and kills over 50,000 people. It also gives sea access to Amsterdam, allowing its development as an important port city.
- Winter – Mongol invasion of Poland: Mongol forces (some 30,000 men) under Talabuga Khan and Nogai Khan, attack Poland for the third time. The cities of Lublin, Sandomierz and Sieradz are devastated by the invaders. Nogai Khan besieges Kraków and launches an unsuccessful assault on the fortified city, suffering heavy casualties in the process.

====== England ======
- February – South England flood: A large storm hits the south coast, this has a powerful effect on the Cinque Ports, two of which are hit (Hastings and New Romney). The storm destroys Old Winchelsea on Romney Marsh and nearby Broomhill. The course of the Rother River is diverted away from New Romney, which is almost destroyed, ending its role as a port; the Rother runs instead to the sea at Rye – whose prospects as a port are enhanced. A cliff collapses at Hastings, ending its role as a trade harbor and demolishing a part of Hastings Castle. New Winchelsea is established on higher ground.
- June 8 – Welsh forces led by Rhys ap Maredudd revolt in Wales against King Edward I (Longshanks). Although Maredudd has assisted the English in the past, he accuses Edward of treating him unfairly over taxes. The rebels burn several towns, including Swansea and Carmarthen. They capture most of Ystrad Tywi, heartland of Deheubarth (the revolt will not be suppressed until 1288).
- Summer – Edward I (Longshanks) replies to the Welsh rebellion by raising an army at Gloucester commanded by Edmund of Almain. The English forces besiege Dryslwyn Castle, which lasts for three weeks before the castle falls after the curtain walls are undermined. Rhys ap Maredudd manages to escape and goes into hiding before the stronghold is finally captured in late September.
- December – Parts of Norfolk are flooded, the port of Dunwich in Suffolk is further devastated, and in The Fens through the storm and the violence of the sea, the monastery of Spalding and many churches are overthrown and destroyed: "The whole country in the parts of Holland was, for the most part, turned into a standing pool so that an intolerable multitude of men, women and children were overwhelmed with the water, especially in the town of Boston, a great part thereof was destroyed."

====== Middle East ======
- Spring – Arghun Khan, Mongol ruler of the Ilkhanate, sends an embassy under Rabban Bar Sauma with the mission of contracting a military alliance against the Mamluk Sultanate and take the city of Jerusalem. He travels with a large retinue (bearing gifts and letters) and 30 riding animals from Tabriz through Armenia to Trebizond. Bar Sauma arrives in Constantinople and receives an audience with Emperor Andronikos II (Palaiologos).
- March – Mamluk forces under Sultan Qalawun (the Victorious) capture Latakia, last remnant of the Principality of Antioch. The city port falls easily into his hands, but the defenders retire to the citadel at the mouth of the harbour. Finally, Qalawun forces the Crusader garrison to surrender on April 20.
- October 19 – Bohemond VII, ruler of Tripoli, dies childless. He is succeeded by his sister Lucia, who is married to Charles I of Naples' former Grand Admiral, Narjot de Toucy. But the nobles, not pleased with this decision, offer the county to Bohemond's mother, Dowager-Princess Sibylla of Armenia.
- Winter – Two unidentified 'merchants' travel from Alexandria to Cairo to warn Qalawun of the economic dangers posed by Genoese domination in the eastern Mediterranean, which leaves the Mamluk trade at their mercy. Qalawun accepts the invitation to intervene, and breaks the truce with Tripoli.

====== Africa ======
- An Aragonese fleet raids the Tunisian Kerkennah Islands in the Gulf of Gabès.

====== Asia ======
- January 30 – Wareru creates the Hanthawaddy kingdom (modern Myanmar) following the collapse of the Pagan Kingdom. He is crowned king on April 5 and declares himself independent of Pagan.
- May 14 – Nayan, Mongol prince of the Borjigin clan, revolts against the rule of Kublai Khan. Kublai leads a punitive expedition against Nayan in Manchuria and defeats his forces on July 16.
- December – Battle of Pagan: Mongol-led Yuan forces (some 7,000 cavalry) led by Temür Khan defeat King Thihathu of the Pagan Kingdom. The kingdom disintegrates and anarchy ensues.
- Kings Mangrai of the Lanna Kingdom (modern Thailand) and Ram Khamhaeng of the Sukhothai Kingdom agree to a peace treaty. They establish a "strong pact of friendship".

==== By topic ====
====== Art and Culture ======
- The Altar of St. James in Pistoia Cathedral, Italy – a masterwork of the silversmithing trade containing nearly a ton of silver – is begun; it will not be completed for nearly 200 years.

====== Economy ======
- The Italian city of Siena exacts a forced loan from its taxpayers for the first time, a common feature of medieval public finance.

====== Religion ======
- March 16 – Synod of Würzburg: A church council is held by Cardinal Giovanni Boccamazza and King Rudolf I at Würzburg. During the assembly, Giovanni announces the taxation of the clergy to finance the expedition of Rudolf (known as the Italienzug) to Rome and the imperial coronation.
- April 3 – Pope Honorius IV dies after a 2-year pontificate at Rome. During his reign, he tries to restore Sicily to papal vassalage, but Honorius clashes with King Peter III (the Great), who supports Sicilian independence.
- Construction of Uppsala Cathedral in Sweden begins (it lasts until 1435).

=== 1288 ===
==== By place ====
====== Europe ======
- A civil war breaks out on Gotland between the burghers of Visby and the rural farmers of Gotland; while the exact reason for this war is unknown, the most likely reason is the construction of a large wall around Visby, and the introduction of a toll, which the farmers were forced to pay.
- June 5 – War of the Limburg Succession – Battle of Worringen: Brabantian forces under Duke John I defeat the coalition army of Cologne, Luxemburg, and Nassau at Worringen (in a struggle to conquer the Duchy of Limburg). John liberates the city of Cologne from rule by the Electorate of Cologne, which has previously been one of the major ecclesiastical principalities of the Holy Roman Empire.
- Summer – Sultan Muhammad II drives the rebellious Banu Ashqilula from one stronghold to the next, where they are finally expelled from Granadan territory in Al-Andalus (modern Spain). Meanwhile, Muhammad manages through diplomatic intrigue, to turn the Castilian aristocracy against King Sancho IV. In response, King Alfonso III proclaims the 18-year-old Alfonso de la Cerda as ruler of Castile and León.
- August 8 – Pope Nicholas IV proclaims a crusade against the 26-year-old King Ladislaus IV, who had lost credibility by favoring his semi-pagan Cuman subjects in Hungary, and in general refusing to conform to the social standards of Western Europe. Meanwhile, the Hungarian government loses more power because the clergy and most of the nobles rule the kingdom independently.
- October 28 – Treaty of Canfranc: King Edward I signs an agreement with Alfonso III at Canfranc, about the release of Charles II, who has been captured by Admiral Roger of Lauria in the Battle of the Gulf of Naples (see 1284).

====== England and Scotland ======
- January 20 – Newcastle Emlyn Castle in West Wales is recaptured by the English forces after a ten-day siege, bringing Rhys ap Maredudd's revolt to an end. Rhys is exiled to Ireland.
- The Parliament of Scotland creates a law allowing women to propose marriage to men during leap years; men who refuse such proposals are required to pay a fine to the spurned bride-to-be.

====== Levant ======
- Spring – Genoa orders Admiral Benedetto Zaccaria to send five galleys to support Genoese suzerainty of Tripoli. Princess Lucia, sister of the late Count Bohemond VII, arrives in Acre, where the Knights Hospitaller escort her to the frontier with Tripoli. The commune refuses to accept her as new ruler and places the city under Genoese protection. After negotiations, Lucia offers to confirm Genoa's existing commercial privileges in Tripoli.

====== Asia ======
- April 9 – Battle of Bạch Đằng: Đại Việt (Vietnamese) general Trần Hưng Đạo sinks the fleet of an invading Mongol-led Yuan expeditionary army (some 94,000 men). He orders the placing of steel-tipped bamboo stakes (to create an ambush) in the Bach Dang River near Ha Long Bay. This ends the intentions of Kublai Khan to conquer Vietnam and Champa.
- April – The Japanese era Kōan ends and the Shōō era begins during the reign of the 22-year-old Emperor Fushimi (until 1293).

==== By topic ====
====== Art and culture ======
- The oldest surviving bell, in the clocks atop the dome of St. Peter's Basilica in Rome, is built.
- Work is begun on the construction of Mob Quad in Merton College, Oxford.

====== Markets ======
- June 16 – Petrus, bishop of Västerås, buys 1/8 of the Stora Kopparberg copper mine in Falun, Sweden. During the reign of King Magnus Ladulås, nobles and foreign merchants from Lübeck take interests in the mining area.
- The Flemish city of Ghent seeks rights to start redeeming its already issued annuities. It is a clear indication of financial difficulty, and maybe an early sign of the crisis of the 13th Century.

====== Religion ======
- February 22 – Nicholas IV is elected as the successor of the late Honorius IV (see 1287) during a conclave in Rome and becomes the 191st pope of the Catholic Church.
- March–April – Rabban Bar Sauma, Chinese Nestorian monk and diplomat, arrives at Rome and is received by Nicholas IV, who gives him communion on Palm Sunday.

====== Technology ======
- The oldest-known bronze handgun in the world is dated to this year, a Chinese gun found in Acheng District, that was once used to suppress the rebellion of the Mongol prince Nayan.

=== 1289 ===
==== By place ====
====== Europe ======
- June 11 – Battle of Campaldino: Pro-papal Guelph forces of Florence and their allies, Lucca, Pistoia, Prato and Siena under Viscount Aimery IV defeat the Ghibelline army (some 10,000 men) in Tuscany. Florence becomes the dominant power in Central Italy; powerful merchant guilds take on a more political role in the communal government against their rivals of Genoa, Pisa and Venice.
- July 7 – Battle of Copenhagen: A Norwegian expeditionary force under King Eric II, supported by Danish outlaws, sets sail to Copenhagen and attacks the city. But they are repelled and forced to withdraw to Zealand.

====== Britain ======
- Summer – King Edward I (Longshanks) proposes a marriage between his infant son, Edward of Caernarfon, and the 6-year-old Margaret (Maid of Norway).
- Construction of Conwy Castle in Wales, ordered by Edward I (Longshanks), is completed.

====== Levant ======
- February 9 – Sultan Qalawun (the Victorious) marches the Mamluk army out of Cairo, leaving his son Al-Ashraf Khalil commanding Cairo's Citadel, supported by Viceroy Baydara al-Mansuri. The army moves via Salihiya, across Sinai and through Jordan to Damascus. He orders the regional governors of Syria to mobilize in Damascus, where many infantry volunteers have assembled.
- March – The 19-year-old King Henry II sends his younger brother Almalric, with a company of knights and 4 galleys to Tripoli (modern Lebanon). Meanwhile, many non-combatant citizens flee to Cyprus. The Mamluk army arrives before Tripoli and begins the attack with siege engines, while building buches (wooden defensive structures) outside the city on March 25.
- April 26 – Siege of Tripoli: Mamluk forces under Qalawun (the Victorious) capture Tripoli after a month-long siege, thus extinguishing the County of Tripoli. Qalawun orders the city to be razed to the ground, a widespread massacre kills every man found by the Mamluks, while the women and children are taken as slaves.
- July–August – Admiral Benedetto Zaccaria, having escaped from Tripoli, starts a naval campaign against Mamluk shipping and raids Tinnis in Egypt. In response, Qalawun closes Alexandria to Genoese merchants.

==== By topic ====
====== Education ======
- Pope Nicholas IV formally constitutes the University of Montpellier in France by papal bull, combining various existing schools under the mantle of a single university.

====== Markets ======
- In Siena, twenty-three partners, including five members of the Bonsignori family, re-create the Gran Tavola, formerly the most successful European bank, which had ceased its operations after the death of its creator and manager, Orlando Bonsignori, in 1273.

== Births ==
1280

- Birger, King of Sweden, Swedish monarch (d. 1321)
- Wu Zhen, Chinese painter (d. 1354)
- Approximate date
  - Anna of Kashin, Russian princess consort and saint (d. 1368)
  - Mansa Musa, mansa of the Mali Empire (d. c.1337)

1281

- August 4 – Külüg Khan (or Wuzong), Mongol emperor (d. 1311)
- December 25 – Alice de Lacy, English noblewoman (d. 1348)
- Agnes of Austria, queen consort of Hungary (House of Árpád) (d. 1364)
- Maurice de Berkeley, English nobleman (d. 1326)
- Castruccio Castracani, Italian nobleman and knight (d. 1328)
- Hamdallah Mustawfi, Persian official and historian (d. 1340)
- Henry of Lancaster, English nobleman and knight (d. 1345)
- Joan Butler (or FitzGerald), Irish countess of Carrick (d. 1320)
- John Harington, English nobleman and politician (d. 1347)
- John Stonor, English lawyer and Chief Justice (d. 1354)
- Orhan Ghazi, Turkish ruler of the Ottoman Empire (d. 1362)
- Nizamüddin Ahmed Pasha, Ottoman statesmen (d. 1380)
- Richard Grey, English nobleman and diplomat (d. 1335)
- Rudolf I, king of Bohemia (House of Habsburg) (d. 1307)
- Sancia of Majorca, queen consort and regent of Naples (d. 1345)
- Yury of Moscow (Yuri III Danilovich), Grand Prince of Vladimir (d. 1325)
- Zhu Shizhen, Chinese founder of the Ming dynasty (d. 1344)

1282

- February 2 – Maud Chaworth, English noblewoman (d. 1322)
- April 1 – Louis IV (the Bavarian), Holy Roman Emperor (d. 1347)
- April 15 – Frederick IV (the Fighter), German nobleman (d. 1329)
- May 5 – Juan Manuel, Spanish nobleman and prince (d. 1348)
- June 19 – Gwenllian ferch Llywelyn, princess of Wales (d. 1337)
- August 7 – Elizabeth of Rhuddlan, English princess (d. 1316)
- Alexios II (Megas Komnenos), emperor of Trebizond (d. 1330)
- Annibale di Ceccano, Italian cardinal and archbishop (d. 1350)
- Blanche of France, French princess (House of Capet) (d. 1305)
- Clare of Rimini, Italian noblewoman, nun and saint (d. 1346)
- Eric Magnusson, Swedish prince and heir apparent (d. 1318)
- Konoe Iehira, Japanese nobleman (Fujiwara Clan) (d. 1324)
- Li Shixing (or Zhun Dao), Chinese landscape painter (d. 1328)
- Nicholas Kőszegi, Hungarian prelate and bishop (d. 1336)
- Oshin, king of Cilician Armenia (House of Lampron) (d. 1320)
- Özbeg Khan, Mongol ruler of the Golden Horde (d. 1341)
- Paolo Dagomari di Prato, Italian mathematician (d. 1374)
- Spinetta Malaspina (the Great), Italian nobleman (d. 1352)

1283

- April 9 – Margaret, Maid of Norway, queen-designate of Scotland (d. 1290)
- Anthony de Lucy (or Luci), English nobleman and knight (d. 1343)
- Fujiwara no Kinshi, Japanese empress consort and nun (d. 1352)
- Galvano Fiamma, Italian Dominican friar and chronicler (d. 1344)
- Isabella of Castile, queen consort of Aragon, daughter of Sancho IV ("the Brave") (d. 1328)
- John of Charolais (or Clermont), French nobleman (d. 1322)
- Matteo Villani, Italian historian, chronicler and writer (d. 1363)
- Shuho Myocho, Japanese teacher and Zen Master (d. 1338)
- Siemowit II of Masovia, Polish nobleman and prince (d. 1345)
- Yoshida Kenkō, Japanese Buddhist monk and writer (d. 1350)

1284

- April 25 – Edward II, king of England (d. 1327)
- April 26 – Alice de Toeni, Countess of Warwick, English noblewoman (d. 1325)
- Delphine of Glandèves, French noblewoman (d. 1358)
- Edward, Count of Savoy ("the Liberal"), Savoyan nobleman (d. 1329)
- John I, Dutch nobleman (House of Holland) (d. 1299)
- Piers Gaveston, 1st Earl of Cornwall, English nobleman and knight, royal favourite (k. 1312)
- Wernher von Homberg, Swiss knight and poet (d. 1320)
- Yu Qin, Chinese official, geographer and writer (d. 1333)
- Approximate date – Thomas de Brus, Scottish nobleman and knight (k. 1307)

1285

- March 9 – Go-Nijō (or Nijō II), Japanese emperor (d. 1308)
- March 23 – Al-Mustakfi I, Mamluk ruler (caliph) of Egypt (d. 1340)
- March 24 – Al-Nasr Muhammad, Mamluk ruler of Egypt (d. 1341)
- April 9 – Ayurbarwada Buyantu Khan, Mongol emperor (d. 1320)
- May 1 – Edmund Fitzalan, English nobleman and knight (d. 1326)
- December 6 – Ferdinand IV, king of Castile and León (d. 1312)
- Alexander de Bruce, Scottish nobleman and knight (d. 1307)
- Euphemia of Pomerania, queen consort of Denmark (d. 1330)
- Francesco I Ventimiglia, Italian nobleman and knight (d. 1338)
- Gerardus Odonis, French cardinal and theologian (d. 1349)
- John of Jandun, French philosopher and theologian (d. 1328)
- Juan Alonso Pérez de Guzán, Spanish nobleman (d. 1351)
- Margaret of Artois, French noblewoman and regent (d. 1311)
- Patrick V de Dunbar, Scottish nobleman and knight (d. 1369)
- Richeza Magnusdotter, Swedish princess and abbess (d. 1348)
- William of Ockham, English monk and theologian ( d. 1347)
- Ziauddin Barani, Indian historian and philosopher (d. 1358)

1286

- February 2 – Joan de Geneville, English noblewoman (d. 1356)
- March 8 – John III (the Good), English nobleman (d. 1341)
- June 30 – John de Warenne, English nobleman (d. 1347)
- September 4 – John de Mowbray, English nobleman (d. 1322)
- September 28 – Shōshi, Japanese empress consort (d. 1348)
- Alfonso de Castilla, Spanish nobleman and prince (d. 1291)
- Guy of Ibelin, Outremer nobleman and seneschal (d. 1308)
- Hōjō Mototoki, Japanese nobleman and regent (d. 1333)
- Hugh Despenser (the Younger), English nobleman (d. 1326)
- Ibn al-Akfani, Persian physician and encyclopedist (d. 1348)
- James Douglas, Scottish nobleman and general (d. 1330)
- John de Burgh, Irish nobleman and heir apparent (d. 1313)
- John Palaiologos, Byzantine prince and governor (d. 1307)
- Juana Núñez (Lady of Lara), Spanish noblewoman (d. 1351)
- Kalonymus ben Kalonymus, French-Jewish philosopher (d. 1328)
- Marco Cornaro, doge of Venice (House of Cornaro) (d. 1368)
- Odoric of Pordenone, Italian priest and missionary (d. 1331)
- William I (the Good), Dutch nobleman and knight (d. 1337)

1287

- January 24 – Richard Aungerville, English bishop (d. 1345)
- April 25 – Roger Mortimer, English de facto ruler (d. 1330)
- June 15 – Alice de Warenne, English noblewoman (d. 1338)
- September 29 – John Hastings, English nobleman (d. 1325)
- November 1 – Nasr of Granada, Al-Andaluse ruler (d. 1322)
- Frederick I, Piedmontese nobleman and knight (d. 1336)
- Gaston I, Occitan nobleman, prince and knight (d. 1315)
- Guy de Penthièvre, Breton nobleman and knight (d.1331)
- Ibn Nubata, Egyptian scholar, poet and writer (d. 1366)
- Konoe Tsunehira, Japanese court official (kugyō) (d. 1318)
- Margaret de Clare, Norman-Irish noblewoman (d. 1333)
- Margaret of Castello, Italian nun and teacher (d. 1320)
- Oliver Ingham, English landowner and knight (d. 1344)
- Robert III, French nobleman (House of Capet) (d. 1342)
- Tang Di, Chinese landscape painter and poet (d. 1355)
- Ulrich V, German nobleman, marshal and knight (d. 1354)
- Wang Mian (or Yuanzhang), Chinese painter (d. 1359)
- Zhang Zhu, Chinese historian, poet and writer (d. 1368)

1288

- January 20 – Robert Lisle, English nobleman (d. 1344)
- April 5 – Go-Fushimi, emperor (tenno) of Japan (d. 1336)
- November 1 – Ivan I, Grand Duke of Moscow (d. 1341)
- November 26 – Go-Daigo, emperor of Japan (d. 1339)
- Adolph II de la Marck, French prince-bishop (d. 1344)
- Blanche of Burgundy, French noblewoman (d. 1348)
- Charles I, king of Hungary (House of Anjou) (d. 1342)
- Gersonides, French Jewish mathematician (d. 1344)
- Guillaume I, French nobleman and knight (d. 1335)
- John of Beaumont, Dutch nobleman and knight (d. 1356)
- Mahmoud Shabestari, Persian poet and writer (d. 1340)
- Nicholas II, German nobleman and chamberlain (d. 1365)
- Nicolas Béhuchet, French nobleman and admiral (d. 1340)
- Nijō Michihira, Japanese nobleman and advisor (d. 1335)
- Pedro Afonso, Portuguese nobleman and knight (d. 1350)
- Philip of Majorca, Aragonese prince and regent (d. 1343)
- Pierre Desprès, French cardinal and diplomat (d. 1361)

1289

- May 24 – Afonso Sanches, Portuguese nobleman and knight (d. 1329)
- October 4 – Louis X (the Quarrelsome), king of France (d. 1316)
- October 6 – Wenceslaus III, king of Hungary and Croatia (d. 1306)
- Alfonso de la Cerda, Spanish nobleman and archdeacon (d. 1327)
- Alice Comyn, Scottish noblewoman (House of Brienne) (d. 1349)
- Donnchadh IV, Scottish nobleman, magnate and knight (d. 1353)
- Eleanor of Anjou, queen consort of Sicily (House of Anjou) (d. 1341)
- Frederick the Fair (or the Handsome), king of Germany (d. 1330)
- Joan of Artois, French noblewoman and ruler (suo jure) (d. 1350)
- Ton'a (or Tonna), Japanese Buddhist poet and writer (d. 1372)
- William de Shareshull, English lawyer and chief justice (d. 1370)

== Deaths ==
1280

- February 10 – Margaret II, Countess of Flanders (b. 1202)
- May 9 – Magnus VI of Norway
- August 22 – Pope Nicholas III (b. 1218)
- November 15 – Albertus Magnus, German theologian
- Approximate date – Ertuğrul, Ottoman bey, father of Osman I

1281

- February 16 – Gertrude of Hohenberg, queen of Germany (b. 1225)
- March 20 – Chabi, Mongol empress and wife of Kublai Khan (b. 1225)
- March 30 – Conrad of Mure, Swiss monk, scholar and writer (b. 1210)
- April 4 – Maurice de Berkeley, English nobleman and knight (b. 1218)
- September 10 – John II, margrave of Brandenburg-Stendal (b. 1237)
- September 20 – Reinhard I, German nobleman and knight (b. 1225)
- October 8 – Constance of Greater Poland, Polish princess (b. 1245)
- December 24 – Henry V (the Great), count of Luxembourg (b. 1216)
- Alfonso Fernández el Niño, Spanish nobleman and prince (b. 1243)
- Anna of Hungary, Byzantine empress (House of Árpád) (b. 1260)
- Bruno von Schauenburg, German bishop, advisor and diplomat
- Ertuğrul Ghazi, Turkish ruler of the Sultanate of Rum (b. 1198)
- Sheikh Yusof Sarvestani, Persian astronomer and calligrapher
- Xu Heng, Chinese scholar, official and philosopher (b. 1209)

1282

- January 8 – Hōjō Yoshimasa, Japanese nobleman (b. 1243)
- February 22 – Guiscardo Suardi, Italian prelate and bishop
- February 24 – Philippe Mouskes, French bishop and writer
- March 2 – Agnes of Bohemia, Bohemian princess (b. 1211)
- March 22 – Benvenutus Scotivoli, Italian priest and bishop
- April 4
  - Abaqa Khan, Mongol ruler of the Ilkhanate (b. 1234)
  - Bernard Ayglerius (or Aygler), French cardinal (b. 1216)
- April 10 – Ahmad Fanakati, Persian minister and politician
- April 26 – Möngke Temür, Mongol ruler of Shiraz (b. 1256)
- April 29 – Guillaume de Bray, French prelate and cardinal
- May 16 – Thomas III, Savoyan nobleman (House of Savoy)
- June 19 – Eleanor de Montfort, princess of Wales (b. 1252)
- August 25 – Thomas de Cantilupe, English bishop (b. 1218)
- September 9 – Ingrid of Skänninge, Swedish noblewoman
- October 13 – Nichiren, Japanese Buddhist priest (b. 1222)
- October 27 – Roger Mortimer, English nobleman (b. 1231)
- October 30 – Ibn Khallikan, Barmakid historian (b. 1211)
- November 6
  - Luke de Tany, English nobleman and seneschal
  - Roger de Clifford, English nobleman and knight
- December 11
  - Llywelyn ap Gruffudd, prince of Wales (b. 1223)
  - Michael VIII Palaiologos, Byzantine emperor
- December 17 – Wichard of Pohlheim, German bishop
- Alice de la Roche, Outremer noblewoman and regent
- Benedetto Sinigardi, Italian Franciscan friar (b. 1190)
- George Akropolites, Byzantine historian and statesman
- Hugh de Benin (or Benhyem), Scottish cleric and bishop
- Isabella of Ibelin, Outremer noblewoman (House of Ibelin)
- Margaret Sambiria, Danish queen and regent (b. 1230)
- Robert IV, French nobleman (House of Dreux) (b. 1241)
- Robert de Neville, English nobleman and knight (b. 1223)
- Alexander Stewart, 4th High Steward of Scotland (Alexander of Dundonald), Scottish nobleman (b. 1220)

1283

- January 9 – Wen Tianxiang, Chinese poet and politician (b. 1236)
- February/March – Yaghmurasen ibn Zyan, Zayyanid ruler of Tlemcen (b. 1206)
- March 23 – Joseph I of Constantinople (Galesiotes), Byzantine abbot and patriarch
- April 9 – Margaret of Scotland, Queen of Norway, the Maid of Scotland, queen consort of Norway (b. 1261)
- April 23 – John Bradfield, English bishop and precentor
- June 7 – Robert of Holy Island, English Benedictine monk and bishop
- August 12 – Blanche of Navarre, Duchess of Brittany, Breton noblewoman (b. 1226)
- September 26 – Princess Kuniko (or Hoshi), Japanese empress (b. 1209)
- October 3 – Dafydd ap Gruffydd, Welsh prince (b. 1238)
- October 10 – Peter of Castile, Lord of Ledesma, Spanish prince (infante) (b. 1260)
- October 15 – John I of Werle, German nobleman (House of Mecklenburg)
- November 27 – John of Montfort, Lord of Tyre, Outremer nobleman and knight
- November 30 – John of Vercelli, Italian Master General (b. 1205)
- December 8 – Richard of Ware, English abbot and theologian
- December 15 – Philip I (or Courtenay), Latin Emperor of Constantinople (b. 1243)
- December 25 – Manuel of Castile, Spanish nobleman (b. 1234)
- Abutsu-ni, Japanese noblewoman, nun, poet and writer (b. 1222)
- Ata-Malik Juvayni, Persian ruler, historian and writer (b. 1226)
- Hermann III, German nobleman (House of Ascania) (b. 1230)
- Siraj al-Din Urmavi, Ayyubid scholar and philosopher (b. 1198)
- Xie Daoqing, Chinese empress consort and regent (b. 1210)
- Yolanda of Vianden, Luxembourgian nun and prioress (b. 1231)
- Zakariya al-Qazwini, Persian astronomer and writer (b. 1203)

1284

- January 18 – Qonqurtai, Mongol nobleman and viceroy
- January 28 – Alexander, Scottish prince and heir (b. 1264)
- February 12 – Humphrey of Montfort, Outremer nobleman
- March 24 – Hugh III ("the Great"), king of Cyprus (b. 1235)
- March 28 – John de Derlington, English archbishop and theologian
- c. March – Kaykhusraw III, Seljuk ruler of the Sultanate of Rum, executed
- April 4 – Alfonso X ("the Wise"), king of Castile (b. 1221)
- April 6 – Peter I, Count of Alençon, French nobleman and prince (b. 1251)
- April 9 – Adelaide of Holland, Dutch noblewoman (b. 1230)
- April 15 – Jordan of Osnabrück, German political writer
- April 20 – Hōjō Tokimune, Japanese nobleman (b. 1251)
- May – Isa ibn Muhanna, Mamluk ruler, commander and prince
- July 30 – Sturla Þórðarson, Icelandic chieftain (b. 1214)
- August 9 – James of Castile, Lord of Cameros, son of Alfonso X (b. 1268)
- August 10 – Tekuder, Mongol ruler of the Ilkhanate (b. 1246)
- August 19 – Alphonso, Earl of Chester, English nobleman and heir (b. 1273)
- August 30 – Ichijō Sanetsune, Japanese nobleman (b. 1223)
- October 16 – Shams al-Din Juvayni, Persian ruler and vizier
- November 9 – Siger of Brabant, Dutch philosopher (b. 1240)
- December – Irene Komnene Palaiologina, Byzantine princess (b. 1218)
- Al-Mansur II Muhammad, Ayyubid ruler of Hama (b. 1214)
- Ibn Kammuna, Arab Jewish philosopher and writer (b. 1215)

1285

- January 7 – Charles I, king of Sicily (House of Anjou) (b. 1227)
- February 8 – Theodoric of Landsberg, German nobleman (b. 1242)
- March 28 – Martin IV, pope of the Catholic Church (approximate date)
- May 13 – Robert de Ros, English nobleman and knight (b. 1235)
- May 20 – John I, king of Cyprus (House of Lusignan) (b. 1268)
- June 3 – William I van Brederode, Dutch nobleman and knight
- June 19 – Yekuno Amlak, Ethiopian ruler (House of Solomon)
- July 3 – Margaret of Flanders, French noblewoman (b. 1251)
- July 7 – Tile Kolup, German impostor claiming to be Frederick II
- July 28 – Keran of Lampron, queen of Cilician Armenia (b. 1260)
- July 30 – John I, German nobleman (House of Ascania) (b. 1249)
- August 16 – Philip I, French nobleman (House of Savoy) (b. 1207)
- August 18 – William Reade, English bishop and theologian (b. 1183)
- August 22 – Philip Benizi, Italian monk and religious leader (b. 1233)
- August 27 – William de Wickwane, English cleric and archbishop
- September 9 – Kunigunda of Halych, queen of Bohemia (b. 1245)
- September 26 – Theobald Butler, Norman chief governor (b. 1242)
- October 5 – Philip III, king of France (House of Capet) (b. 1245)
- November 2 – Peter III (the Great), king of Aragon (b. 1239)
- November 21 – Fulke Lovell, English archdeacon and bishop
- December 21 – Ordoño Álvarez, archbishop of Braga (b. 1198)
- Abu al-Baqa al-Rundi, Andalusian poet and literary critic (b. 1204)
- Christian III, German nobleman and knight (House of Oldenburg)
- Hermann of Buxhoeveden, German cleric and bishop (b. 1230)
- Izz al-Din ibn Shaddad, Syrian scholar and historian (b. 1217)
- João de Lobeira, Portuguese troubadour and writer (b. 1233)
- Nicolas Lorgne, French nobleman, knight and Grand Master
- Otto III (or IV), German nobleman (House of Ascania) (b. 1244)
- Paolo Malatesta (the Beautiful), Italian nobleman and knight
- Paul of Segni, Italian nobleman, friar, bishop and papal legate
- Philippe de Carteret, Norman nobleman and knight (b. 1205)
- Shihab al-Din al-Qarafi, Egyptian scholar and jurist (b. 1228)

1286

- January 4 – Anna Komnene Doukaina, princess of Achaea
- January 5 – Zhenjin (or Chingkim), Mongol prince (b. 1243)
- February 17 – Luca Belludi, Italian friar and religious leader
- March 2 – Fujiwara no Ariko, Japanese empress (b. 1207)
- March 19 (or 18) – Alexander III, king of Scotland (b. 1241)
- March 20 – Abu Yusuf Yaqub ibn Abd al-Haqq, Marinid ruler
- April 20 – Buluqhan Khatun (or Bulugan), Mongol princess
- June 16 – Hugh de Balsham, English sub-prior and bishop
- July 5 (or 4) – Hartmann V, German nobleman and bishop
- July 30 – Bar Hebraeus, Syrian scholar and bishop (b. 1226)
- September 22 – Mugaku Sogen, Chinese adviser (b. 1226)
- October 3 – Fujiwara no Tameuji, Japanese poet (b. 1222)
- October 8 – John I (the Red), English nobleman and knight
- November 1 – Anchero Pantaléone, French cardinal (b. 1210)
- November 9 – Roger Northwode, English nobleman (b. 1230)
- November 22 – Eric V (Klipping), king of Denmark (b. 1249)
- December 15 – William de Warenne, English knight (b. 1256)
- Arlotto of Prato, Italian friar, Minister General and theologian
- Beatrice of Castile, daughter of Alfonso X (the Wise) (b. 1254)
- Bertram Morneweg, German merchant, traveler and councilor
- Ibn Sa'id al-Maghribi, Andalusian historian and writer (b. 1213)
- Jacob I (the Learned), Armenian cleric, catholicos and writer
- Pantaleone Giustinian, Latin cleric, papal legate and patriarch
- Pierre Coral, French monk, priest, abbot, historian and writer
- Reynold FitzPiers, English nobleman, High Sheriff and knight
- Sharaf al-Din Harun Juvayni (or Joveyni), Persian statesman
- Simon II of Clermont, French nobleman and regent (b. 1210)
- Sophia of Denmark (Eriksdotter), queen of Sweden (b. 1241)
- William of Moerbeke, Flemish philosopher and writer (b. 1215)

1287

- March 20 – Ambrose of Siena, Italian nobleman and missionary (b. 1220)
- April 3 – Honorius IV, pope of the Catholic Church (b. 1210)
- July 1
  - Ananda Pyissi, Burmese chief minister and general
  - Narathihapate (or Sithu IV), Burmese ruler (b. 1238)
- July 27 – Hugh of Evesham, English cardinal and physician
- August 13 – Hōjō Shigetoki, Japanese nobleman (b. 1241)
- August 29 – Thomas de Clare, Norman nobleman (b. 1245)
- August 31 – Konrad von Würzburg, German poet and writer
- September 8 – Giordano Orsini, Italian deacon and cardinal
- October 19 – Bohemond VII, Outremer nobleman (b. 1261)
- October 21 – Stephen Bersted, English cleric and bishop
- Abu al-Abbas al-Mursi, Andalusian Sufi leader (b. 1219)
- Aju (or Achu), Mongol general and chancellor (b. 1227)
- Bernhard I, German prince (House of Ascania) (b. 1218)
- Goffredo da Alatri, Italian nobleman, canon and cardinal
- Ingeborg Eriksdotter, queen consort of Norway (b. 1244)
- Llywelyn ap Dafydd, Welsh nobleman and prince (b. 1267)
- Prijezda I, Bosnian nobleman (ban) and knight (b. 1211)
- William I de la Roche, Latin nobleman and vicar-general
- William de Ferrers, English nobleman and knight (b. 1240)
- Ziemomysł of Kuyavia, Polish prince and knight (b. 1245)

1288

- February 15 – Henry III (the Illustrious), German nobleman
- April 24 – Gertrude of Austria, Austrian noblewoman (b. 1226)
- June 5
  - Henry VI, count of Luxembourg (the Condemned)
  - Waleran I, French nobleman (House of Luxembourg)
- June 8 – Lope Díaz III, Spanish nobleman and knight (b. 1245)
- June 26 – Siegfried IV, German nobleman and prince-bishop
- July 3 – Stephen de Fulbourn, English archbishop and politician
- August 2 – Alix of Brittany (or Blois), Breton noblewoman (b. 1243)
- September 7 – Agnes of Dampierre, French noblewoman (b. 1237)
- September 29 – Matilda of Brabant, French noblewoman (b. 1224)
- September 30 – Leszek II (the Black), Polish nobleman (b. 1241)
- November 11 – Beatrice of Brabant, countess of Flanders (b. 1225)
- November 19 – Rudolf I, German nobleman and regent (b. 1230)
- December 17 – Ibn al-Nafis, Syrian scholar and polymath (b. 1213)
- Guillaume III, French nobleman, chamberlain and knight (b. 1217)
- Matilda of Holstein (or Mechthild), queen consort of Denmark
- Shang Ting, Chinese calligrapher, poet and writer (b. 1209)
- Tikkana Somayaji, Indian Prime-Minister and poet (b. 1205)
- Wang Qinghui, Chinese concubine, poet and writer (b. 1264)

1289

- January 16 – Buqa (or Bugha), Mongol nobleman and chancellor
- February 26 – Przemko of Ścinawa, Polish nobleman and knight
- March 10 – Maud de Lacy (or Matilda), English noblewoman (b. 1223)
- March 12 – Demetrius II (the Devoted), king of Georgia (b. 1259)
- March 19 – John of Parma, Italian priest and theologian (b. 1209)
- April 19 – Conrad of Ascoli, Italian monk and missionary (b. 1234)
- May 24 – Frederick V, German nobleman (House of Hohenzollern)
- May 27 – John III, German nobleman and co-ruler of Mecklenburg
- June 11 – Bonconte I da Montefeltro, Italian nobleman (b. 1250)
- August 24 – Patrick III, Scottish nobleman and regent (b. 1213)
- Alexander Comyn, Scoto-Norman nobleman, magnate and knight
- Bentivenga da Bentivengi, Italian monk, cleric and cardinal-bishop
- Catherine Birgersdotter, Swedish noblewoman (House of Bjälbo)
- David Mac Cerbaill (or MacCarwell), Irish monk and archbishop
- Diego López IV, Spanish nobleman and knight (House of Haro)
- Eudes de Montreuil, French master builder, sculptor and engineer
- Fakhr al-Din Iraqi (or Araqi), Persian poet, philosopher and writer
- Gruffydd Fychan I, English nobleman and prince of Powys Fadog
- Guy III, French nobleman, knight and regent (House of Châtillon)
- Il-yeon, Korean Buddhist monk, historian and calligrapher (b. 1206)
- Ippen (or Zuien), Japanese Buddhist monk and preacher (b. 1234)
- Petrus de Dacia, Swedish monk, hagiographer and writer (b. 1235)
- Ugolino della Gherardesca, Italian nobleman, politician and admiral
