= 1282 =

1282 in various calendars
- Gregorian calendar: 1282; MCCLXXXII
- Ab urbe condita: 2035
- Armenian calendar: 731; ԹՎ ՉԼԱ
- Assyrian calendar: 6032
- Balinese saka calendar: 1203–1204
- Bengali calendar: 688–689
- Berber calendar: 2232
- English Regnal year: 10 Edw. 1 – 11 Edw. 1
- Buddhist calendar: 1826
- Burmese calendar: 644
- Byzantine calendar: 6790–6791
- Chinese calendar: 辛巳年 (Metal Snake); 3979 or 3772 — to — 壬午年 (Water Horse); 3980 or 3773
- Coptic calendar: 998–999
- Discordian calendar: 2448
- Ethiopian calendar: 1274–1275
- Hebrew calendar: 5042–5043
- Hindu calendars
- Vikram Samvat: 1338–1339
- Shaka Samvat: 1203–1204
- Kali Yuga: 4382–4383
- Holocene calendar: 11282
- Igbo calendar: 282–283
- Iranian calendar: 660–661
- Islamic calendar: 680–681
- Japanese calendar: Kōan 5 (弘安５年)
- Javanese calendar: 1192–1193
- Julian calendar: 1282; MCCLXXXII
- Korean calendar: 3615
- Minguo calendar: 630 before ROC 民前630年
- Nanakshahi calendar: −186
- Thai solar calendar: 1824–1825
- Tibetan calendar: ལྕགས་མོ་སྦྲུལ་ལོ་ (female Iron-Snake); 1408 or 1027 or 255 — to — ཆུ་ཕོ་རྟ་ལོ་ (male Water-Horse); 1409 or 1028 or 256

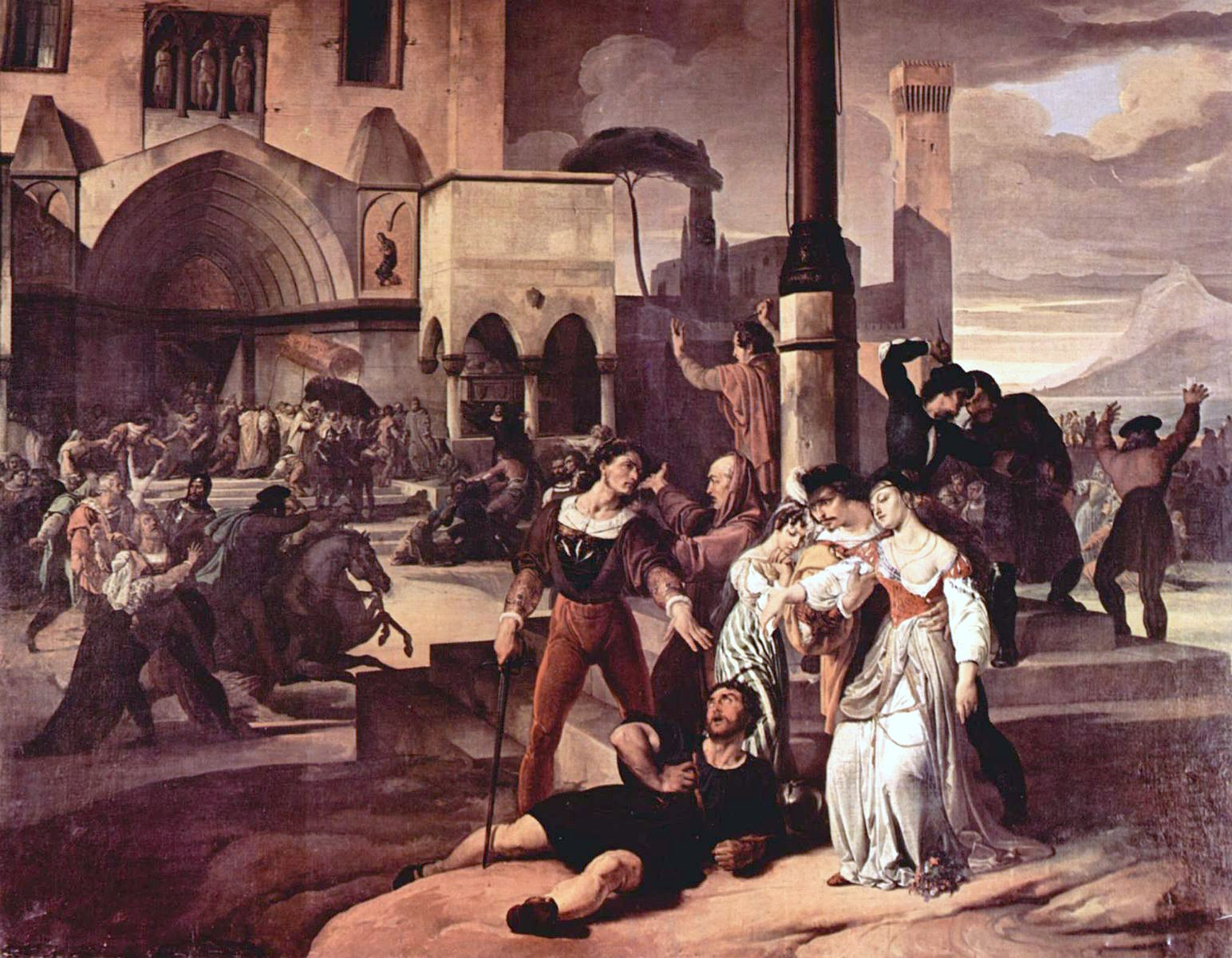
The War of the Sicilian Vespers: Rebels massacre French soldiers (c. 1822)

Year 1282 (MCCLXXXII) was a common year starting on Thursday of the Julian calendar.

== Events ==
=== By place ===
==== Europe ====
- March – Welsh forces under Prince Dafydd ap Gruffydd, brother of Llywelyn ap Gruffudd, attack and take control of Hawarden Castle. The garrison is massacred and Constable Roger de Clifford is taken prisoner. Llywelyn, who has sworn fealty to King Edward I of England ("Longshanks"), joins Dafydd in his revolt against the English. Their actions lead to the final English conquest of Wales, by Edward.
- March 30 – War of the Sicilian Vespers: A group of Sicilian conspirators begins an uprising against the rule of King Charles I of Sicily; over the next six weeks, thousands of French are killed. The rebellion forces Charles to abandon the planned crusade against the Byzantines, while still en route to the target city of Constantinople, and allows King Peter III of Aragon ("the Great") to take over rule of the island from Charles (which in turn leads to Peter's excommunication by Pope Martin IV).
- May 1 – Battle of Forlì: A French expeditionary army under Jean d'Eppe launches an assault on Forlì and breaches the outer wall. While they plunder the suburbs, Guido I da Montefeltro sends a small force out the gate on the opposite side of the city. In an ambush, forces of the Guelphs and Ghibellines defeat the main army of d'Eppe, who is forced to retreat to Faenza. He asks the Pope for reinforcements, but this is refused.
- Summer – An Aragonese expeditionary army under King Peter III lands in North Africa at Collo, in proclaimed support of a rebellion of the governor of Constantine, Ibn Wazir. The revolt is suppressed by Abu Ishaq Ibrahim I, ruler of the Hafsid Sultanate. Peter, wary of the situation in Sicily, sails off and fails to take advantage of the state of rebellion in North Africa. Ibrahim stabilizes his power and styles himself emir of the sultanate.
- June – The 24-year-old Prince Sancho, heir to the throne of Castile, assembles a coalition of nobles and starts a massive rebellion against his father, King Alfonso X. He dispatches his brothers into the realm to claim strategically important cities and castles. Only the cities of Seville, Murcia and Badajoz remain loyal to Alfonso, who becomes isolated politically and abandoned by most of his family.
- June 17 – Battle of Llandeilo Fawr: English forces led by Gilbert de Clare are ambushed and defeated by Welsh troops at Llandeilo. English expansion into southern Wales is halted.
- June 26 – King Denis of Portugal ("the Poet King") marries the 11-year-old Elizabeth of Aragon, daughter of Peter III, in Trancoso. Elizabeth receives the towns of Óbidos, Abrantes and Porto de Mós as part of her dowry. Denis, known for his poetry, writes several poems and books, with topics of administration and hunting. During his reign, Lisbon becomes one of Europe's centers of art and culture.
- July – Alfonso X of Castile allies himself with Abu Yusuf Yaqub ibn Abd al-Haqq, ruler of the Marinid Sultanate, who crosses the straits and establishes a camp at Zahara de la Sierra, in southern Spain. Alfonso offers the Castilian royal crown of his father and grandfathers as a pledge of re-payment of a loan. Out of pity, Abu Yusuf gives him 100,000 gold dinars.
- August – Castilian forces under Sancho lay siege to Badajoz, but eventually retreat as the combined armies of Alfonso X relieve the city. Shortly after, Alfonso marches to Córdoba and demands the key of the city. This is refused by Diego López V de Haro, speaking on behalf of the magnates. Meanwhile, the Marinids plunder the Guadalquivir valley.
- August 30 – Peter III of Aragon, traveling with his fleet on a military expedition against Tunis, ends up in the Sicilian town of Trapani, after being asked by the inhabitants of Palermo to help in the fight against Charles I.
- September 4 – Peter III of Aragon is proclaimed "King of Sicily". Charles is forced to flee across the Strait of Messina, and be content with the Kingdom of Naples (ruling a part of the Italian Peninsula with the Pope).
- September or October – Battle of Lake Hód: Hungarian forces led by King Ladislaus IV successfully repel and defeat an invading Cuman army. Ladislaus receives the title "the Cuman" for his heroic victory.
- November – Castilian forces under Alfonso X reconquer Córdoba. Pope Martin IV issues a papal bull, forcing Sancho and his nobles to proclaim their allegiance to Alfonso, ending the rebellion.
- November 6 – Battle of Moel-y-don: English forces led by Luke de Tany are ambushed and defeated by Welsh troops, while crossing over a floating bridge to the island of Anglesey.
- December 11 – Battle of Orewin Bridge: English forces (some 6,000 men) under Edward I of England defeat a Welsh army near Cilmeri. Llywelyn ap Gruffudd is killed.
- December 27 – King invests his sons, Albert I and Rudolf II, as co-rulers of the duchies of Austria and Styria, and lays the foundation of the House of Habsburg in these territories.
- Dutch forces led by Floris V, count of Holland, attack and defeat the West Frisians at the battle of Vronen. He succeeds in retrieving the body of his father, William II, some 26 years dead.
- King Stefan Dragutin breaks his leg while hunting and becomes ill. He abdicates the throne in favor of his younger brother, Stefan Milutin, who becomes ruler of Serbia (until 1321).
- Peter III of Aragon obtains the support of Nasrid Granada preparing for the incoming Aragonese Crusade, led by Philip "the Fair" of France.
- Daniel of Moscow, youngest son of Alexander Nevsky, is mentioned during this year as an independent Prince of the Grand Duchy of Moscow. This Duchy will be a vassal state of the Golden Horde until 1471, later evolving into the Tsardom of Russia.

=== By topic ===
==== Education ====
- Hertford College is founded, at the University of Oxford.

==== Markets ====
- The form for the Trial of the Pyx in England, during which it is confirmed that newly minted coins conform to required standards, is established.
- First evidence of the existence of consolidated public debt in Bruges, confirming the expansion of use of annuities, to fund government expenditure to the Low Countries.

==== Nature ====
- The most recent phreatic eruption of Larderello, observed, at Boracifero crater lake in southern Tuscany.

==== Technology ====
- The technology of watermarks is introduced by paper manufacturers of Bologna, Italy.

==== Religion ====
- John Peckham, archbishop of Canterbury, orders all the synagogues of London to close, and forbids Jewish doctors from practicing on non-Jews.
- Construction of Albi Cathedral in Languedoc begins.

== Births ==
- February 2 – Maud Chaworth, English noblewoman (d. 1322)
- April 1 – Louis IV ("the Bavarian"), Holy Roman Emperor (d. 1347)
- April 15 – Frederick IV ("the Fighter"), German nobleman (d. 1329)
- May 5 – Juan Manuel, Spanish nobleman and prince (d. 1348)
- June 19 – Gwenllian ferch Llywelyn, princess of Wales (d. 1337)
- August 7 – Elizabeth of Rhuddlan, English princess (d. 1316)
- Alexios II ("Megas Komnenos"), emperor of Trebizond (d. 1330)
- Annibale di Ceccano, Italian cardinal and archbishop (d. 1350)
- Blanche of France, French princess (House of Capet) (d. 1305)
- Clare of Rimini, Italian noblewoman, nun and saint (d. 1346)
- Eric Magnusson, Swedish prince and heir apparent (d. 1318)
- Konoe Iehira, Japanese nobleman (Fujiwara Clan) (d. 1324)
- Li Shixing (or Zhun Dao), Chinese landscape painter (d. 1328)
- Nicholas Kőszegi, Hungarian prelate and bishop (d. 1336)
- Oshin, king of Cilician Armenia (House of Lampron) (d. 1320)
- Özbeg Khan, Mongol ruler of the Golden Horde (d. 1341)
- Paolo Dagomari di Prato, Italian mathematician (d. 1374)
- Rudolf I, king of Bohemia (House of Habsburg) (d. 1307)
- Spinetta Malaspina ("the Great"), Italian nobleman (d. 1352)

== Deaths ==
- January 8 – Hōjō Yoshimasa, Japanese nobleman (b. 1243)
- February 22 – Guiscardo Suardi, Italian prelate and bishop
- February 24 – Philippe Mouskes, French bishop and writer
- March 2 – Agnes of Bohemia, Bohemian princess (b. 1211)
- March 22 – Benvenutus Scotivoli, Italian priest and bishop
- April 4
  - Abaqa Khan, Mongol ruler of the Ilkhanate (b. 1234)
  - Bernard Ayglerius (or Aygler), French cardinal (b. 1216)
- April 10 – Ahmad Fanakati, Persian minister and politician
- April 26 – Möngke Temür, Mongol ruler of Shiraz (b. 1256)
- April 29 – Guillaume de Bray, French prelate and cardinal
- May 16 – Thomas III, Savoyan nobleman (House of Savoy)
- June 19 – Eleanor de Montfort, princess of Wales (b. 1252)
- August 25 – Thomas de Cantilupe, English bishop (b. 1218)
- September 9 – Ingrid of Skänninge, Swedish noblewoman
- October 13 – Nichiren, Japanese Buddhist priest (b. 1222)
- October 27 – Roger Mortimer, English nobleman (b. 1231)
- October 30 – Ibn Khallikan, Barmakid historian (b. 1211)
- November 6
  - Luke de Tany, English nobleman and seneschal
  - Roger de Clifford, English nobleman and knight
- December 11
  - Llywelyn ap Gruffudd, prince of Wales (b. 1223)
  - Michael VIII Palaiologos, Byzantine emperor
- December 17 – Wichard of Pohlheim, German bishop
- Alice de la Roche, Outremer noblewoman and regent
- Benedetto Sinigardi, Italian Franciscan friar (b. 1190)
- George Akropolites, Byzantine historian and statesman
- Hugh de Benin (or Benhyem), Scottish cleric and bishop
- Isabella of Ibelin, Outremer noblewoman (House of Ibelin)
- Margaret Sambiria, Danish queen and regent (b. 1230)
- Robert IV, French nobleman (House of Dreux) (b. 1241)
- Robert de Neville, English nobleman and knight (b. 1223)
- Alexander Stewart, 4th High Steward of Scotland (Alexander of Dundonald), Scottish nobleman (b. 1220)
