= 1287 =

1287 in various calendars
- Gregorian calendar: 1287; MCCLXXXVII
- Ab urbe condita: 2040
- Armenian calendar: 736; ԹՎ ՉԼԶ
- Assyrian calendar: 6037
- Balinese saka calendar: 1208–1209
- Bengali calendar: 693–694
- Berber calendar: 2237
- English Regnal year: 15 Edw. 1 – 16 Edw. 1
- Buddhist calendar: 1831
- Burmese calendar: 649
- Byzantine calendar: 6795–6796
- Chinese calendar: 丙戌年 (Fire Dog); 3984 or 3777 — to — 丁亥年 (Fire Pig); 3985 or 3778
- Coptic calendar: 1003–1004
- Discordian calendar: 2453
- Ethiopian calendar: 1279–1280
- Hebrew calendar: 5047–5048
- Hindu calendars
- Vikram Samvat: 1343–1344
- Shaka Samvat: 1208–1209
- Kali Yuga: 4387–4388
- Holocene calendar: 11287
- Igbo calendar: 287–288
- Iranian calendar: 665–666
- Islamic calendar: 685–686
- Japanese calendar: Kōan 10 (弘安１０年)
- Javanese calendar: 1197–1198
- Julian calendar: 1287; MCCLXXXVII
- Korean calendar: 3620
- Minguo calendar: 625 before ROC 民前625年
- Nanakshahi calendar: −181
- Thai solar calendar: 1829–1830
- Tibetan calendar: མེ་ཕོ་ཁྱི་ལོ་ (male Fire-Dog); 1413 or 1032 or 260 — to — མེ་མོ་ཕག་ལོ་ (female Fire-Boar); 1414 or 1033 or 261

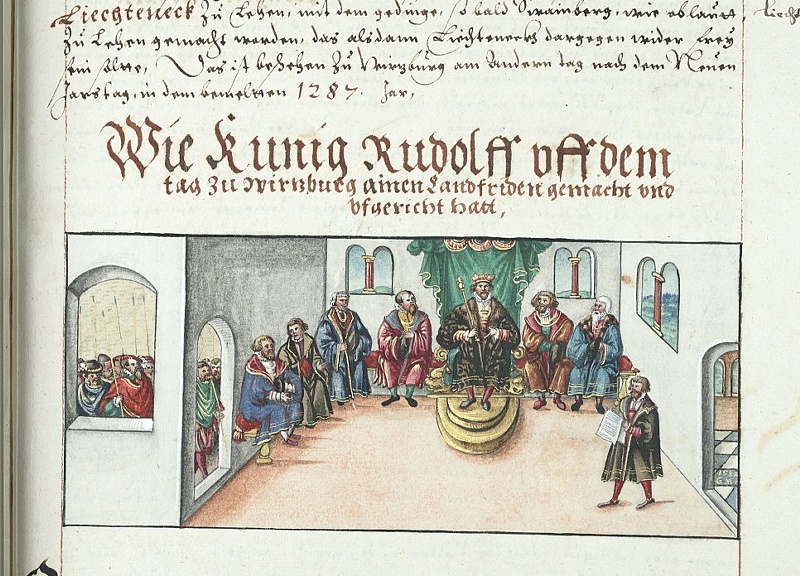
King Rudolf I (middle) at the Synod of Würzburg (or Diet of Würzburg).

Year 1287 (MCCLXXXVII) was a common year starting on Wednesday of the Julian calendar.

== Events ==
=== By place ===
==== Europe ====
- January 17 – Aragonese forces led by King Alfonso III (the Liberal) conquer the island of Menorca. He signs the "Treaty of San Agayz" with Sultan Abû 'Umar ibn Sa'îd on January 21. Alfonso accepts a policy of free trade for merchants and their property. He also concludes an alliance against the Marinids with Abu Said Uthman I, ruler of the Zayyanid Kingdom of Tlemcen (modern Algeria). He proposes to supply him with five to ten galleys (with food and other goods) in exchange for 500 elite Zayyanid horsemen.
- Alfonso III (the Liberal) is forced to make concessions to the nobility after an aristocratic uprising (called the Union of Aragon). In particular, he grants his barons a "Bill of Rights", known as the Privilegium Generale. This leaves a heritage of disunity and further dissent among the nobility, who increasingly see little reason to respect the throne, and brings the Crown of Aragon to the point of anarchy. Alfonso, who is not pleased with the anti-royalist movement, is forced to accept the Magna Carta (Great Charter).
- June – Rabban Bar Sauma, Chinese Nestorian monk and diplomat, travels from Constantinople to Italy. There he arrives in Naples and witnesses a sea battle in the harbour between the Aragonese and the Angevin fleets. Bar Sauma goes to Rome, but arrives too late to meet Pope Honorius IV, who recently died. He instead is engaged in negotiations with the cardinals, who are in a conclave to elect a successor, and visits the St. Peter's Basilica. Bar Sauma goes to Genoa, where he receives a warm welcome.
- June 23 – Battle of the Counts: An Aragonese-Sicilian fleet (some 50 galleys) under Admiral Roger of Lauria defeat a larger Angevin fleet of 70 galleys near Naples. After a feigned retreat, Roger attacks the Angevin galleys from all sides. During the battle, which last much of the day, the Angevin fleet is scattered, leaving about 40 galleys to be captured, along with 5,000 prisoners. After the victory, without any authorization from King James II, Roger makes a truce with the Neapolitans (who are allies of the Angevins).
- September – Rabban Bar Sauma arrives in Paris, and is received in an audience by King Philip IV (the Fair). He spends one month at the royal court, during his stay, Philip himself escorts him around the Sainte-Chapelle (or Holy Chapel) to see the collection of Passion relics by late King Louis IX (the Saint). Philip gives Bar Sauma many presents and sends one of his noblemen, Gobert de Helleville, to return with him to Mongol lands. In response, he attempts to form a military alliance with France and England.
- December 14 – A huge storm and associated storm tide in the North Sea and English Channel, known as St. Lucia's flood in the Netherlands, kills thousands and reshapes the coastline of the Netherlands and England. In the Netherlands, a fringing barrier between the North Sea and a shallow lake collapses, causing the fifth-largest flood in recorded history – which creates the Zuider Zee inlet, and kills over 50,000 people. It also gives sea access to Amsterdam, allowing its development as an important port city.
- Winter – Mongol invasion of Poland: Mongol forces (some 30,000 men) under Talabuga Khan and Nogai Khan, attack Poland for the third time. The cities of Lublin, Sandomierz and Sieradz are devastated by the invaders. Nogai Khan besieges Kraków and launches an unsuccessful assault on the fortified city, suffering heavy casualties in the process.

==== England ====
- February – South England flood: A large storm hits the south coast, this has a powerful effect on the Cinque Ports, two of which are hit (Hastings and New Romney). The storm destroys Old Winchelsea on Romney Marsh and nearby Broomhill. The course of the Rother River is diverted away from New Romney, which is almost destroyed, ending its role as a port; the Rother runs instead to the sea at Rye – whose prospects as a port are enhanced. A cliff collapses at Hastings, ending its role as a trade harbor and demolishing a part of Hastings Castle. New Winchelsea is established on higher ground.
- June 8 – Welsh forces led by Rhys ap Maredudd revolt in Wales against King Edward I (Longshanks). Although Maredudd has assisted the English in the past, he accuses Edward of treating him unfairly over taxes. The rebels burn several towns, including Swansea and Carmarthen. They capture most of Ystrad Tywi, heartland of Deheubarth (the revolt will not be suppressed until 1288).
- Summer – Edward I (Longshanks) replies to the Welsh rebellion by raising an army at Gloucester commanded by Edmund of Almain. The English forces besiege Dryslwyn Castle, which lasts for three weeks before the castle falls after the curtain walls are undermined. Rhys ap Maredudd manages to escape and goes into hiding before the stronghold is finally captured in late September.
- December – Parts of Norfolk are flooded, the port of Dunwich in Suffolk is further devastated, and in The Fens through the storm and the violence of the sea, the monastery of Spalding and many churches are overthrown and destroyed: "The whole country in the parts of Holland was, for the most part, turned into a standing pool so that an intolerable multitude of men, women and children were overwhelmed with the water, especially in the town of Boston, a great part thereof was destroyed."

==== Middle East ====
- Spring – Arghun Khan, Mongol ruler of the Ilkhanate, sends an embassy under Rabban Bar Sauma with the mission of contracting a military alliance against the Mamluk Sultanate and take the city of Jerusalem. He travels with a large retinue (bearing gifts and letters) and 30 riding animals from Tabriz through Armenia to Trebizond. Bar Sauma arrives in Constantinople and receives an audience with Emperor Andronikos II (Palaiologos).
- March – Mamluk forces under Sultan Qalawun (the Victorious) capture Latakia, last remnant of the Principality of Antioch. The city port falls easily into his hands, but the defenders retire to the citadel at the mouth of the harbour. Finally, Qalawun forces the Crusader garrison to surrender on April 20.
- June – Egyptian Mamluk forces under Sultan Qalawun (the Victorious) captures Dongola after defeating the Kingdom of Makuria under the leadership of Egyptian general Izz al-Din al-Kawrani.
- October 19 – Bohemond VII, ruler of Tripoli, dies childless. He is succeeded by his sister Lucia, who is married to Charles I of Naples' former Grand Admiral, Narjot de Toucy. But the nobles, not pleased with this decision, offer the county to Bohemond's mother, Dowager-Princess Sibylla of Armenia.
- Winter – Two unidentified 'merchants' travel from Alexandria to Cairo to warn Qalawun of the economic dangers posed by Genoese domination in the eastern Mediterranean, which leaves the Mamluk trade at their mercy. Qalawun accepts the invitation to intervene, and breaks the truce with Tripoli.

==== Africa ====
- An Aragonese fleet raids the Tunisian Kerkennah Islands in the Gulf of Gabès.

==== Asia ====
- January 30 – Wareru creates the Hanthawaddy kingdom (modern Myanmar) following the collapse of the Pagan Kingdom. He is crowned king on April 5 and declares himself independent of Pagan.
- May 14 – Nayan, Mongol prince of the Borjigin clan, revolts against the rule of Kublai Khan. Kublai leads a punitive expedition against Nayan in Manchuria and defeats his forces on July 16.
- December – Battle of Pagan: Mongol-led Yuan forces (some 7,000 cavalry) led by Temür Khan defeat King Thihathu of the Pagan Kingdom. The kingdom disintegrates and anarchy ensues.
- Kings Mangrai of the Lanna Kingdom (modern Thailand) and Ram Khamhaeng of the Sukhothai Kingdom agree to a peace treaty. They establish a "strong pact of friendship".

=== By topic ===
==== Art and Culture ====
- The Altar of St. James in Pistoia Cathedral, Italy – a masterwork of the silversmithing trade containing nearly a ton of silver – is begun; it will not be completed for nearly 200 years.

==== Economy ====
- The Italian city of Siena exacts a forced loan from its taxpayers for the first time, a common feature of medieval public finance.

==== Religion ====
- March 16 – Synod of Würzburg: A church council is held by Cardinal Giovanni Boccamazza and King Rudolf I at Würzburg. During the assembly, Giovanni announces the taxation of the clergy to finance the expedition of Rudolf (known as the Italienzug) to Rome and the imperial coronation.
- April 3 – Pope Honorius IV dies after a 2-year pontificate at Rome. During his reign, he tries to restore Sicily to papal vassalage, but Honorius clashes with King Peter III (the Great), who supports Sicilian independence.
- Construction of Uppsala Cathedral in Sweden begins (it lasts until 1435).

== Births ==
- January 24 – Richard Aungerville, English bishop (d. 1345)
- April 25 – Roger Mortimer, English de facto ruler (d. 1330)
- June 15 – Alice de Warenne, English noblewoman (d. 1338)
- September 29 – John Hastings, English nobleman (d. 1325)
- November 1 – Nasr of Granada, Al-Andaluse ruler (d. 1322)
- Frederick I, Piedmontese nobleman and knight (d. 1336)
- Gaston I, Occitan nobleman, prince and knight (d. 1315)
- Guy de Penthièvre, Breton nobleman and knight (d.1331)
- Ibn Nubata, Egyptian scholar, poet and writer (d. 1366)
- Konoe Tsunehira, Japanese court official (kugyō) (d. 1318)
- Margaret de Clare, Norman-Irish noblewoman (d. 1333)
- Margaret of Castello, Italian nun and teacher (d. 1320)
- Oliver Ingham, English landowner and knight (d. 1344)
- Robert III, French nobleman (House of Capet) (d. 1342)
- Tang Di, Chinese landscape painter and poet (d. 1355)
- Ulrich V, German nobleman, marshal and knight (d. 1354)
- Wang Mian (or Yuanzhang), Chinese painter (d. 1359)
- Zhang Zhu, Chinese historian, poet and writer (d. 1368)

== Deaths ==
- March 20 – Ambrose of Siena, Italian nobleman and missionary (b. 1220)
- April 3 – Honorius IV, pope of the Catholic Church (b. 1210)
- July 1
  - Ananda Pyissi, Burmese chief minister and general
  - Narathihapate (or Sithu IV), Burmese ruler (b. 1238)
- July 27 – Hugh of Evesham, English cardinal and physician
- August 13 – Hōjō Shigetoki, Japanese nobleman (b. 1241)
- August 29 – Thomas de Clare, Norman nobleman (b. 1245)
- August 31 – Konrad von Würzburg, German poet and writer
- September 8 – Giordano Orsini, Italian deacon and cardinal
- October 19 – Bohemond VII, Outremer nobleman (b. 1261)
- October 21 – Stephen Bersted, English cleric and bishop
- Abu al-Abbas al-Mursi, Andalusian Sufi leader (b. 1219)
- Aju (or Achu), Mongol general and chancellor (b. 1227)
- Bernhard I, German prince (House of Ascania) (b. 1218)
- Goffredo da Alatri, Italian nobleman, canon and cardinal
- Ingeborg Eriksdotter, queen consort of Norway (b. 1244)
- Llywelyn ap Dafydd, Welsh nobleman and prince (b. 1267)
- Prijezda I, Bosnian nobleman (ban) and knight (b. 1211)
- William I de la Roche, Latin nobleman and vicar-general
- William de Ferrers, English nobleman and knight (b. 1240)
- Ziemomysł of Kuyavia, Polish prince and knight (b. 1245)
