= Qi Sheng =

Yuan era gazetteer, roughly in modern-day Shandong

Qi Sheng (simplified Chinese: 齐乘; traditional Chinese: 齊乘; pinyin: Qí Shèng; lit. 'A Gazetteer of [Three] Qi') is a Chinese gazetteer written by Yu Qin during the era of the Yuan. Qi (or Three Qi; 三齐) in title refers to a physiographic region that correspond roughly to present-day Shandong province. Published in six volumes, the gazetteer records the administrative divisions, the geography, the ancient monuments, the local customs and the famous people of Shandong. The Siku Quanshu includes an edition of the gazetteer. It is an unofficial work, but the known earliest provincial gazetteer of Shandong yet.
