= Yu Qin =

- Born: 1284
- Died: 1333 (aged 48–49)
- Occupation: Geographer
- Notable work: Qi Sheng

Yu Qin (Chinese: 于钦, 1284–1333) was a Chinese geographer of the Yuan dynasty. In 1319, he was appointed the official of Jinan to resolve the starvation problem caused by bad harvesting. He started to write the geography book Qi Sheng during this period, which was the oldest known geography book about Shandong Province.
