= Battle of Forlì =

1282 battle in Italy

- Part of Guelphs and Ghibellines
- From a fresco by Giovanni Battista Marchetti (1763)
Date	1 May 1282
Location	Forlì, Romagna, present-day Italy
Result	Ghibelline victory: Forlì defended

Belligerents
Guelphs: Pope Martin IV; Charles I of Anjou	Ghibellines: Forlì Imola Bologna Faenza Ravenna Bagnacavallo

Commanders and leaders
Jean d'Eppe; Taddeo II da Montefeltro †	Guido I da Montefeltro

Casualties and losses
2,000–3,000 killed	Heavy

The Battle of Forlì in 1282 took place between an army recruited in France, sent by Pope Martin IV in an attempt to subdue Forlì and the Ghibellines. The Guelph army was defeated thanks to the strategic ability of Guido I da Montefeltro.

The event was remembered by Dante in the Divine Comedy:

» The city which once made the long resistance, And of the French a sanguinary heap «

== Battle ==
On 30 April, some conspirators in Forlì offered to turn the city over to Jean d'Eppe, who immediately marched his men from Faenza to Forlì. Arriving the following day, he found that the conspiracy had been uncovered and the traitors arrested. Nonetheless, d'Eppe launched an assault on the city. The main troops easily breached the outer wall. While they plundered the suburbs, Guido da Montefeltro sent a small force out a gate on the opposite side of the city. In an ambush, this force overcame the Guelph rearguard and surprised the main force. After a bloody battle, d'Eppe was forced to retreat to Faenza.
