= Fujiwara no Kinshi =

Fujiwara no Kinshi may refer to:

- Fujiwara no Kinshi (1134–1209), empress consort of Emperor Go-Shirakawa
- Fujiwara no Kinshi (1283–1352), empress consort of Emperor Go-Nijō
