= Tang Di =

Chinese landscape painter

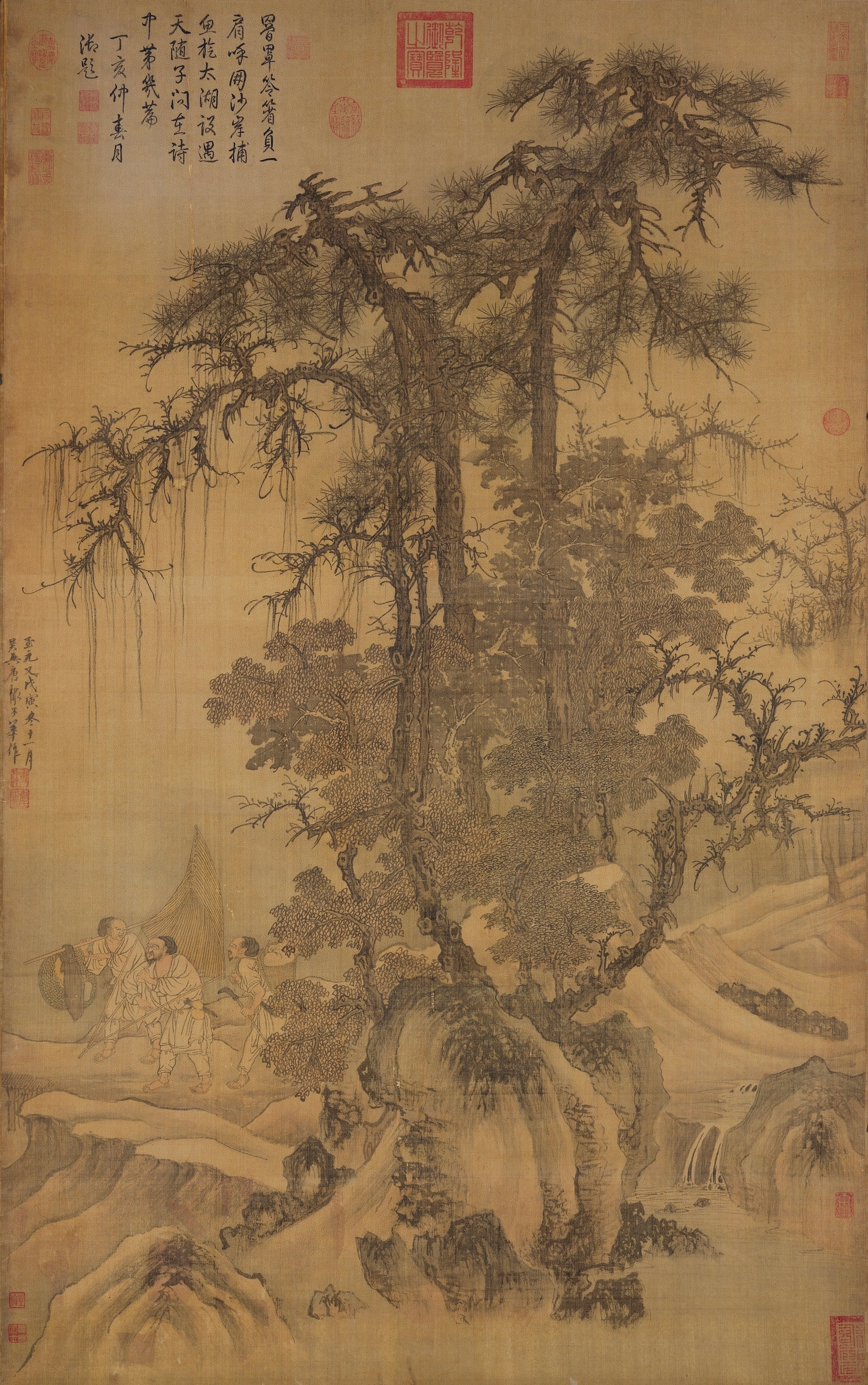
Tang Di, Fishermen Returning on a Frosty Bank, National Palace Museum

Tang Di (Chinese: 唐棣; pinyin: Táng Dì; Wade–Giles: T'ang Ti; (c. 1287 – 1355)), style name as Zihua (子華), pseudonym as Dunzhai, was a Chinese landscape painter during the Yuan Dynasty (1279–1368).

Tang Di was born in the Zhejiang province. Tang Di's poetry and painting were celebrated by the local aristocracy while he was still a young artist. He initially studied the landscape style of Chao Meng-fu. He later also turned to the styles of Wei Yen, Li Ch'eng, and Kuo Hsi. In 1338, Tang Di painted Fishermen Returning on a Frosty Bank.
