= Benvenutus Scotivoli =

Italian Roman Catholic saint

Saint Bishop Benvenutus Scotivoli
- Bishop of Osimo
- Church: Roman Catholic Church
- Diocese: Osimo
- See: Osimo
- Appointed: 13 March 1264
- Term ended: 22 March 1282
- Predecessor: Rinaldo
- Successor: Bernardo de' Berardi

Orders
- Consecration: 1264
- Rank: Bishop

Personal details
- Born: Benvenutus Scotivoli; Unknown Ancona, Papal States
- Died: 22 March 1282 Osimo, Papal States
- Buried: Osimo Cathedral, Osimo, Italy

Sainthood
- Feast day: 22 March
- Venerated in: Roman Catholic Church
- Canonized: 1284; Old Saint Peter's Basilica, Papal States by Pope Martin IV
- Attributes: Episcopal attire; Pastoral staff
- Patronage: Osimo

Benvenutus Scotivoli (died 22 March 1282) was an Italian Roman Catholic prelate who served as the Bishop of Osimo from 1264 until his death. Pope Martin IV canonized him as a saint in 1284.

== Life ==
Benvenutus Scotivoli was born sometime in the 1200s in Ancona.

Scotivoli studied at the Bologna college and studied jurisprudence with Silvestro Gozzolini at which point he was ordained to the priesthood when he returned to his hometown. He was made the archdeacon of Ancona and later its apostolic administrator on 1 August 1263, before Pope Urban IV appointed him as the Bishop of Osimo on 13 March 1264. Scotivoli ordained Nicholas of Tolentino to the priesthood in 1269.

On 15 January 1270, he ordered the San Fiorenzo convent in Posciavalle to sell all of its assets, while a diocesan synod on 7 February 1273 saw him ban the sale of all church properties. On 24 February 1274, Scotivoli rescinded the excommunication of Ripatransone on the orders of Pope Gregory X that the Bishop of Fermo had instituted before that.

He died on 22 March 1284 and was buried in the Osimo Cathedral though his remains were moved down to the crypt in July 1590.

== Canonization ==
Pope Martin IV canonized him in 1284 and he has been the patron saint of Osimo since 1755, when the civic authorities recognized him as such.

== Franciscan discrepancies ==
Inspection of his tomb revealed a dark capuche sewn to a lambskin and it led to the biographer Jean Baldi asserting that Scotivoli was a Franciscan which became an accepted proposition. But in 1765 the Osimo priest Pannelli contended he was not a Franciscan but the saint is still recognized on the Franciscan calendar.
