= Ambrose of Siena =

Italian Dominican teacher, missionary, and diplomat

Blessed Ambrose of Sienna OP
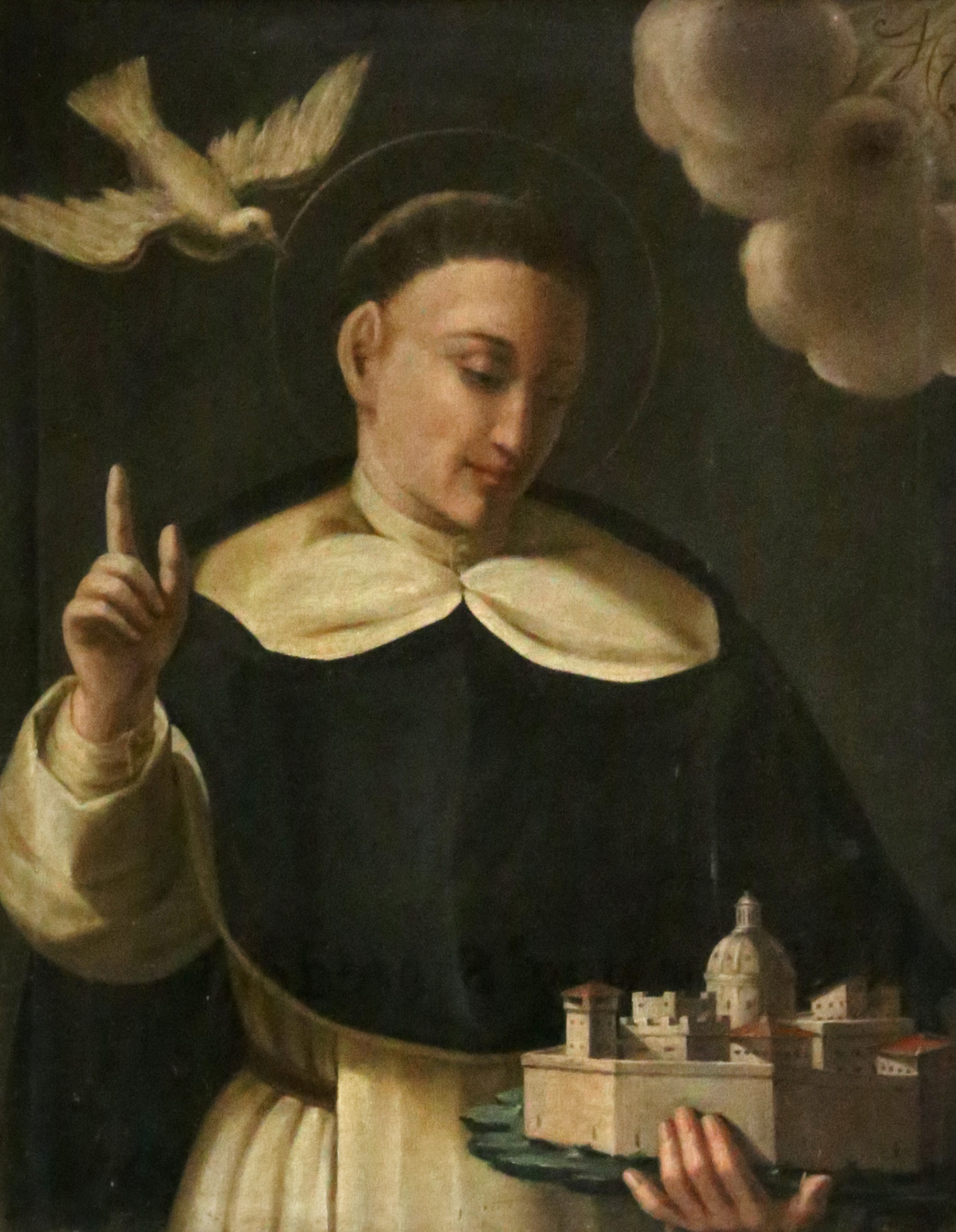
- Born: Ambrogio Sansedoni; 16 April 1220; Siena, Republic of Siena
- Died: 20 March 1287 (aged 66); Siena, Republic of Siena
- Venerated in: Roman Catholic Church
- Beatified: 14 September 1443, Old Saint Peter's Basilica, Papal States by Pope Eugene IV
- Feast: 8 October
- Patronage: Siena

Ambrose of Siena or Sienna (born Ambrogio Sansedoni; 16 April 1220 – 20 March 1287) was an Italian Dominican teacher, missionary and diplomat.

== Biography ==
Ambrose was born at Sienna on 16 April 1220, to the noble family of Sansedoni. When he was around a year old, Ambrose was cured of a congenital deformity, in the Dominican church of St. Mary Magdalene. As a child and youth he was noted for his love of charity, exercised especially towards pilgrims, the sick in hospitals, and prisoners. He entered the novitiate of the Dominican convent in his native city at the age of seventeen, was sent to Paris to continue his philosophical and theological studies under Albert the Great and had for a fellow-student there, Thomas Aquinas.

In 1248 he was sent with Thomas to Cologne, where he taught in the Dominican schools. In 1260 he was one of the band of missionaries who evangelized Hungary. Six years later Sienna was put under an interdict for having espoused the cause of the Emperor Frederick II, then at enmity with the Holy See. The Siennese petitioned Ambrose to plead their cause before the Sovereign Pontiff, and so successfully did he do this that he obtained for his native city full pardon and a renewal of all her privileges. The Siennese soon cast off their allegiance; a second time Ambrose obtained pardon for them. He brought about a reconciliation between King Conradin of Germany and Pope Clement IV.

Around this time he was chosen bishop of his native city, but he declined the office. For a time, he devoted himself to preaching the Eighth Crusade; and later, at the request of Pope Gregory X, caused the studies which the late wars had practically suspended to be resumed in the Dominican convent at Rome. After the death of Pope Gregory X, he retired to one of the convents of his order, whence he was summoned by Innocent V and sent as papal legate to Tuscany. He restored peace there between Florence and Pisa and also between the dogal republics of Venice and Genoa, another pair of commercial rivals within Italy.

He died at Sienna on 20 March 1287. His name was inserted in the Roman Martyrology in 1577. His biographers exhibit his life as one of perfect humility. He loved poetry.

He was a renowned preacher. His oratory, simple rather than elegant, was most convincing and effective. His sermons, although once collected, are not extant.
