= Philippe Mouskes =

Philippe Mouskes (before 1220 – 24 February 1282) was the author of a rhymed chronicle that draws on the history of the Franks and France, from the origins until 1242.

== Biography ==
According to Barthelemy-Charles Dumortier, Philippe Mouskes belonged to a family of French aristocrats and was born in the city of Tournai around the end of the 12th century. He is often confused for Philippe le Gande, bishop of Tournai from 1274, who was also called Muus.

== Work: the Chronique rimée ==
Philippe Mouskes is known for his Chronique rimée (rhymed chronicle) of 31,150 verses, first complete versified chronicle of the kings of France, from the beginnings until Mouskes's time, probably composed between 1242 and 1272.

The Chronique starts with the legend that, following the model of the Aeneid, makes the Franks siblings of Trojan exiled after the fall of Troy. The most important part (a third) is devoted to the reign of Charlemagne. It ends with the reign of Louis IX, in 1242.

Imitating versified chronicles like Wace's chronicle of the dukes of Normandy (12th s.), Mouskes reworks materials from the abbey of Saint-Denis. The direct historic value and the literary value of the work appear rather weak and it seems that the Chronique, judging from the number of remaining manuscripts, was "coldly received". It is known essentially by the extracts that du Cange gives in his Glossarium mediae and infimae latinitatis and in his edition of the Conquest of Constantinople by Geoffrey of Villehardouin.

On the other hand, it presents a certain value as a testimony of the ideology of the French leading classes in the years following the Albigensian Crusade.

== Extract ==
Quar quant li buens rois Charlemaine

Ot toute mise à son demaine
Provence qui mult iert plentive
De vins, de bois, d'aigue, de rive
As leceours, as menestreux,
Qui sunt auques luxurieus

Le donna toute & departi.

where Philippe Mouskes bitterly regrets that Charlemagne, after conquering Provence, gave it to his clowns and minstrels (leceours = lècheurs, "gluttons", "parasites").

== Sources ==
- Histoire Littéraire de la France, 1838
- Glossarium mediæ at infimæ latinitatis / Du Cange, Charles Du Fresne, sieur, 1678

== Bibliography ==
- Chronique rimée, edited by Frédéric Auguste Ferdinand Thomas de Reiffenberg, 1836.
- Exhaustive list of editions and references, in: M. De Reu, 'Philippe Mousket, Chronique rimée; Historia regum francorum', in The Narrative Sources from the Medieval Low Countries. De verhalende bronnen uit de Zuidelijke Nederlanden (Brussels: Koninklijke Commissie voor Geschiedenis, since 2009), ID S050. Narrative Sources (consulted on 21 March 2011).
