= Clare of Rimini =

Italian holy woman who was beatified

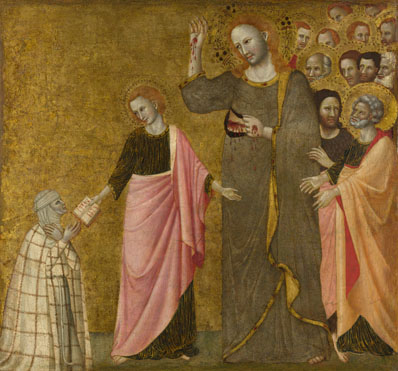
- The Vision of the Blessed Clare of Rimini / Francesco da Rimini (Master of the Blessed Clare). ca. 1333–1340.
- Born: c. 1260; Rimini
- Died: 10 February c. 1326; Rimini
- Venerated in: Roman Catholicism
- Beatified: 22 December 1784 by Pope Pius VI
- Major shrine: Rimini
- Feast: 10 February (in Rimini)

Clare of Rimini (c. 1260 – 10 February c. 1326) was an Italian holy woman who was beatified.

She was born to a wealthy family and married at a young age. She was sent into exile when her husband died, witnessed the political execution of her father and brother, and remarried. She received a calling after attending Mass and founded a penitential community. Her feast day is 10 February.

== Life ==
Chiara was born to a wealthy family of Rimini. Married at a young age, she was sent into exile with her family. Upon her return, she witnessed the execution of her father and brother by a rival political faction. She remarried and lived a life of pleasure and dissipation.

According to Stephen Donovan, one day when she was 34, she attended Mass in the church of the Franciscan Friars, she seemed to hear a mysterious voice that bade her say an Our Father and a Hail Mary at least once with fervour and attention. Clare obeyed the command, not knowing from where it came, and then began to reflect upon her life.

She became a model of every virtue, but especially of charity towards the destitute and afflicted. She abandoned her life of luxury and established an informal community for a group of women under her direction. When the Poor Clares were compelled to leave Regno on account of the prevailing wars, it was mainly through the exertions of Clare that they were able to obtain a means of sustenance at Rimini.

Later, Clare is believed to have worked numerous miracles and towards the close of her life to have been favored in an extraordinary manner with the gift of contemplation. Her body is now in the cathedral of Rimini.

On 22 December 1784, the cult of Blessed Clare was approved by Pope Pius VI, who permitted her feast to be celebrated in the city and Diocese of Rimini on 10 February.

== Critique ==
In 1751 Giuseppe Garampi was appointed Prefect of the Vatican Archives. He published an anonymous fourteenth century vita of Clare of Rimini, which had served as the basis of subsequent biographies. Through the use of careful philological and historical analysis he disputed that Clare had been a Franciscan tertiary and later a Poor Clare. He also argued against her having founded the monastery of Santa Maria degli Angeli in Rimini. Garampi described her as similar to a Beguine, and was a devout laywoman who dressed in a religious habit and practiced poverty and penance, but never took vows or was under a rule. With the details of her vita disputed, the promotion of her cultus (Catholic veneration) to canonization effectively ended. The most important modern scholarship on Clare has been the work of Jacques Dalarun, including a new critical edition of her fourteenth-century Italian vita, and a recent English translation.
