= Bernard Ayglerius =

Bernard Ayglerius (also spelled Aiglerius, Aygler, Ayglier, or Aiglier; 1216 – 4 April 1282) was a French theologian, papal legate, and cardinal. He is sometimes known as Bernardus Cassinensis.

Born in Lyon, Bernard entered the Benedictine monastery of Savigny as a young man and took holy orders. He caught the eye of Pope Innocent IV and was made a papal chaplain sometime before 1244, when he appeared as the auditor of the Sacra Rota Romana. In 1256 he was appointed abbas Lerinensis (abbot of Lérins on the Île Saint-Honorat).

Charles of Anjou brought him along as a privy counsellor to southern Italy in 1266 when he conquered the Kingdom of Sicily. Pope Urban IV named him the 59th abbot of Montecassino on March 29, 1263, a post which he occupied until his death. At Montecassino he recalled the monks from exile, commissioned an inquiry into the monastery's ancient rights (1270s), reformed monastic discipline, recovered lost property, founded a hospital at San Germano, convened a synod, and granted a church to the Dominicans at the request of Thomas Aquinas.

According to several sources, Bernard was created cardinal in the consistory of 1265 or 1268, being the only cardinal created by Pope Clement IV. Some scholars (e.g. Konrad Eubel), however, doubt his promotion to the cardinalate, because he did not participate in any papal conclave or election celebrated after his alleged promotion, did not subscribe any papal bulls issued in this time, and did not reside in the papal curia. It is not known also to which cardinalatial order he belonged and which title or deaconry he received. He frequently acted as a papal legate: in France against the Cathars and in Constantinople against the Greek Orthodox and in promoting a Crusade. Upon his return from Constantinople he found Angevin troops occupying the castle of Montecassino and convinced Charles of Anjou to remove them.

Bernard died at Montecassino and was buried there.

== Sources ==
- Bautz, Friedrich Wilhelm (1975). "Ayglerius, Bernhard". In Bautz, Friedrich Wilhelm (ed.). Biographisch-Bibliographisches Kirchenlexikon (BBKL) (in German). Vol. 1. Hamm: Bautz. cols. 311–312. ISBN 3-88309-013-1.
- Féghali, François-Xavier. Bernard Aygler, Ayglier, ou Aiglier. Citadelle: un autre regard sur le Moyen Age. Accessed 23 February 2008.
- Loud, Graham A. "Continuity and change in Norman Italy: the Campania during the eleventh and twelfth centuries." Journal of Medieval History, Volume: 22, Issue: 4 (December, 1996), pp. 313–343.
- Miranda, Salvador. Biographical Dictionary: Pope Clement IV (1265-1268), Consistory of 1265 or 1268 (I). The Cardinals of the Holy Roman Church. Accessed 23 February 2008.
