= Gobert de Helleville =

Gobert de Helleville was a French nobleman from Helleville in Normandy, who was sent to the Mongols by king Philip the Fair in 1288. Gobert accompanied the Mongol ambassador Rabban Bar Sauma on his return trip.

Gobert is indirectly mentioned in the Syrian accounts describing Rabban Bar Sauma's voyage to Christians lands:

"And he said unto us, "I will send with you one of the great Amirs whom I have here with me to give an answer to King Arghon"; and the king gave Rabban Sawma gifts and apparel of great price."

— "The Monks of Kublai Khan Emperor of China

Gobert de Helleville departed on 2 February 1288 with two clercs, Robert de Senlis and Guillaume de Bruyères, as well as arbaletier Audin de Bourges. They joined Bar Sauma in Rome, and accompanied him to Persia.
