= Paolo Dagomari di Prato =

Florentine mathematician and astronomer (1282–1374)

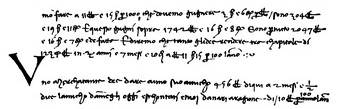
Text from a manuscript of his Trattato d'Abbaco in Paolo's own handwriting

Paolo Dagomari da Prato (1282–1374), known in Latin as Paulus Geometrus (Paolo il Geometra, "Paul the Geometer"), was a noted Florentine mathematician and astronomer, such a maestro dell'abbaco (master/teacher of the abacus) that he gained the epithet Paolo dell'Abbaco. Franco Sacchetti called him Paolo Arismetra e Astrologo (arithmetician and astronomer) and Giorgio Vasari Paulo Strolago or Paolo Astrologo (astronomer). He reputedly had 6,000–10,000 pupils over the course of his life, being praised by contemporaries like Giovanni Gherardi da Prato, Filippo Villani, and Giovanni Villani in his Cronica.

Paolo was born at Prato, the son of Piero Dagomari, who had moved to Florence. At Florence Paolo became the private tutor of Jacopo Alighieri and a friend of Giovanni Boccaccio, who praised him highly in his De genealogia deorum gentilium. The need for mathematics among the bankers and merchants of Florence led him to found a school of arithmetic (bottegha d'abacho) at Santa Trinita. In 1363 he held the priorate of the quarter of S. Spirito from May–June. Paolo died in Florence and was buried in Santa Trinita under a now-lost epitaph. His portrait, in fresco, is painted on the vault of the Galleria degli Uffizi.

In mathematics Paolo introduced the period or comma as a device for separating numbers into groups of three for easing calculations on the order of thousands and millions. He is most famous for his work on equations (aequationibus) that fused geometry and arithmetic, which we today would recognise as algebra. His most important mathematical treatise was the Regoluzze, a manual of elementary arithmetic, written in 1340. Some of the "little rules" are:

1. If you wish to write down [a number of] many figures, make a period at every third figure beginning from the right hand and going towards the left, and then you will have as many thousands as are in front of the periods.
2. If you wish to multiply numbers ending with a zero, multiply their figures and put all of the zeros at the end.
15. If you wish to multiply fraction by fraction, multiply the numerators with one another, and the denominators similarly.
32. If you multiply the width of a circle by 22 and divide by 7, you will have the circumference.
