= Zhang Zhu =

Zhang Zhu (Chinese: 張翥; pinyin: Zhāng Zhù; 1287–1368), courtesy name Zhongju (仲舉), was a Yuan dynasty poet.

A native of (?), he brought himself into notice by his poetry, and was subsequently employed upon the histories of the Liao, Later Jin, and Song dynasties, rising to be a Doctor in the Hanlin Academy and holding other high offices. He was the author of a collection of verses (titled 蛻巖詞). His phrase "cataclysm of the red Goat" (红羊劫), is still used in the sense of "great calamity."

"In the hexagenary system of calendrical calculation, the years bingwu and dingwei in the cycle were believed to be years in which national disasters would occur. In the ten heavenly stems (tiangan) bing and ding, the first character in each combination, belong to the element fire, and their color is red; furthermore, of the zodiac animal signs for the twelve earthly branches (dizhi), the Goat stands for wei. Hence, the "calamity of the red Goat.""
