= Konoe Tsunehira =

Konoe Tsunehira (近衛 経平; 1287 – 1318)

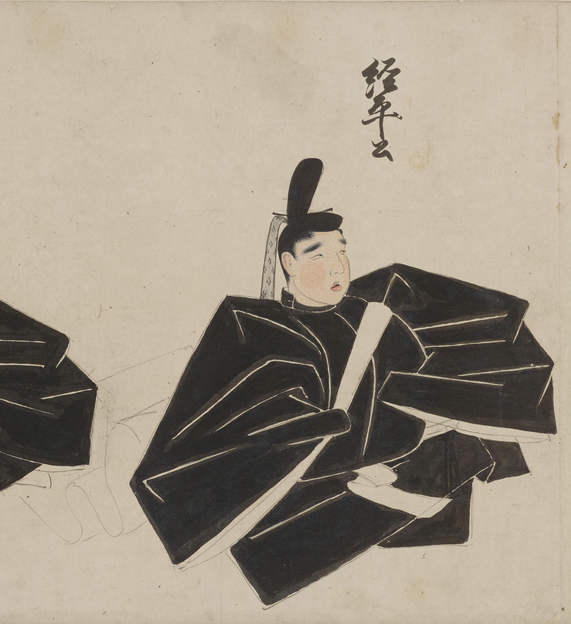

, son of Iemoto, was a kugyō or Japanese court noble of the Kamakura period (1185–1333). He did not hold regent positions kampaku and sessho. Mototsugu was his son.
