= Wang Mian =

Chinese painter and poet

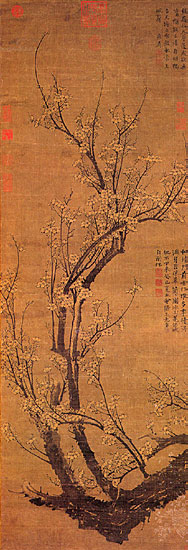
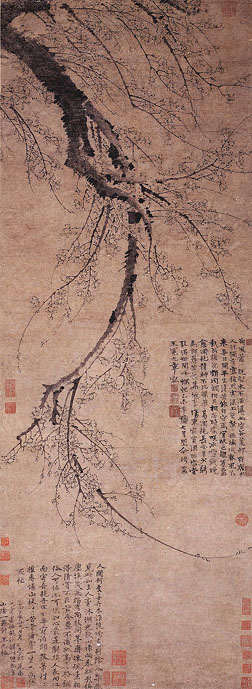
Plum Blossoms in Early Spring and Blossoming plum by Wang Mian

Wang Mian (Chinese: 王冕; pinyin: Wáng Miǎn; Wade–Giles: Wang Mien; 1287–1359), courtesy name Yuanzhang (元章), also known as Zhushi Shannong, was a Chinese painter and poet active during the Yuan dynasty. Initially aspiring to be a government official, Wang later earned considerable recognition as an artist who specialised in plum blossom paintings. Falling out of the public eye in his later years, he had a short stint as military adviser to Zhu Yuanzhang. Wang makes an appearance in the eighteenth-century novel The Scholars.

== Career ==
Wang Mian (born 1287, in Zhuji, Zhejiang) was a Chinese painter and poet of the late Yuan dynasty. Born to a peasant family, he sought to improve his social status and initially prepared for the imperial examinations but failed to obtain the jinshi degree. He then turned to studying the "ancient military arts," though this pursuit was equally unfruitful.

Rejecting several offers of government employment, Wang chose the life of a scholar in retirement, except for a brief period as a teacher. He later established himself as a freelance artist in cities such as Nanjing and Suzhou, specializing in paintings of plum and bamboo, often accompanied by his own poetry.

For Wang, the plum blossom symbolized "his lonely stand in a barbarian-ruled world." He was known by several sobriquets, including "Zhushi Shannong" (煮石山農).

Wang's reputation as a painter and poet grew, and he was hosted by the Yuan Court's Chief Secretary in Beijing. Following years of traversing China, Wang returned to his hometown in Zhejiang Province, and built a "Plum Blossom Retreat", which had some one thousand plum trees planted around it, at the Kuaiji Mountains, where "(h)e wore old clothes and became known as a mild eccentric". In 1359, in the midst of Zhu Yuanzhang's campaign against the Mongols, Wang acted as a military adviser to Zhu's army, albeit an unsuccessful one, as evidenced by the failure of Wang's plan to seize Shaoxing. Wang died in the same year.

== Legacy ==
According to The New York Times, Wang Mian was one of the earliest artists to write poetry on their artworks. In addition, he was "one of the most distinguished practitioners of the reverse-saturation technique". In his lifetime, Wang penned an autobiography titled Mr Plum Blossom's Autobiography, in which he describes himself as "aloof and noble by temperament, hating to mix with the wealthy and powerful, and defending myself in bitterness and agony". After his death, Wang Mian became a "romantic, semilegendary figure". He is the protagonist of the eighteenth-century Chinese novel The Scholars by Wu Jingzi. In The Scholars, Wang's story is heavily dramatised, and his disillusionment with the private sector is attributed not to his failures at the examinations, but his realising "the empty vanity of officialdom". He is also anachronistically written to have become "an anonymous recluse in the mountains" shortly after the establishment of the Ming dynasty by Zhu Yuanzhang. Liu Shiru, who was also from Shaoxing and a respected painter in his own right who published his own plum painting manual, was said to have to have been "engrossed" with Wang Mian's works; he "practiced without eating or sleeping" to reach Wang's standards. Okada Hankō wrote a poem referencing Wang Mian to complement his 1838 painting Village Among Plum Trees.

Wang's painting Prunus in Moonlight was displayed at the June 1985 Bones of Jade, Soul of Ice exhibition at the Yale University Art Gallery. The New York Times commented that the moon and the flowering plum tree in Prunus in Moonlight "play out the kind of male-female, mind-body, moon-earth drama that is not unfamiliar in 20th-century Western art, particularly after Surrealism", going further to compare Wang with Caspar David Friedrich. In his 1976 book Hills Beyond a River, James Cahill exalts Wang Mian as the "most famous of Yuan plum painters". However, art historian Maggie Bickford labels Wang Mian's art as "plain" and "ambitious" in her 1997 book Ink Plum.
