= Jean d'Eppe =

French nobleman (c. 1240 – 1293)

The battle of Forlì, also called the battle of Calendimaggio (1 May), was a disastrous defeat for Jean d'Eppe. His largely French army was reduced, in the words of Dante, to a "bloody heap" (sanguinoso mucchio). The scene depicted here is from a fresco by Giovanni Battista Marchetti (1763).

Jean d'Eppe (c. 1240 – 12 November 1293), known in Italian as Giovanni d'Appia (Note: In contemporary sources, Iohannes de Apia (Latin) or Jehan d'Haippes (Old French). It may be given as Giovanni d'Eppa in Italian, or anglicised as John of Eppes.) or Gianni d'Epa, was a French nobleman who served the Angevin dynasty of the Kingdom of Sicily and the Papal State as a military commander and administrator. He was heavily involved in the conflict between Guelphs, supporters of the Angevin claim to Sicily and of Papal claims in northern Italy, and the Ghibellines, supporters of the Staufer dynasty's claim to Sicily and of Imperial rights in northern Italy.

Jean did not arrive in Sicily until the early 1270s, but he quickly acquired land and castles. Between 1274 and 1281, he served the Sicilian crown as a diplomatic and judicial agent before he was loaned out to the Papacy. Through a series of military campaigns in 1281–83, Jean helped secure Papal control over the Romagna and Maritime Campania. In 1284, he returned to Sicily to assist the Angevins in the War of the Sicilian Vespers against the Aragonese, who were taking up the Staufer claim. He appears to have retired from public activities in 1285, but he returned to an active role in 1289. In 1292, he resigned abruptly and returned to France. Nothing is known of his last year, save that he died in his native village.

== Move to Sicily ==
Jean was the second son of Guillaume, lord of the village of Eppes in northern France. His older brother, Laurent, inherited the lordship from their father. In 1270, Jean joined the Eighth Crusade being organized by King Louis IX against Hafsid Tunisia. It was probably during the crusade that Jean first met Louis IX's brother, King Charles I of Sicily. By 1274 he had settled in Charles' kingdom along with his younger brother Pierre.

It is unknown when between 1270 and 1274 Jean moved to the Kingdom of Sicily, but by 1274 he had already acquired several royal fiefs. In the Terra di Lavoro on the mainland, he had been given the fiefs of Ambrisio, Castrocielo, Pescosolido and Vallecorsa and the royal castle of San Giovanni Incarico. It seems that former holders of some of these fiefs did not relinquish them willingly to Jean, since on 23 August 1275 Charles I had to issue orders to the justiciar of Terra di Lavoro to investigate the illegal retention of fiefs. In the Principato, also on the mainland, Jean held the fief of Campagna. All these fiefs earned him a total revenue of 160 oncie per year.

== Angevin agent ==
The first indication of Jean acting as an agent of the central government comes from August 1274. He and Raynald de Poncel conducted an investigation into the right of pasturage in the lands of Buccino that was claimed by the villagers of nearby Castel San Giorgio. Buccino and its castle were at that time a fief held by Gautier de Sommereuse.

In May 1279, Jean d'Eppe and Jean Toursevache were sent on a secret mission to France. Although the sources do not reveal the nature of this mission, it was probably to the court of Charles I's son and heir, Charles of Salerno, then acting as his father's vicar in the County of Provence. The two Jeans may have been arranging for the younger Charles to mediate in the ongoing war between France and Castile over Navarre. Charles I was still holding the king of Castile's brother, Henry, a prisoner.

In 1281, Charles of Salerno's son, Charles Martel, the third in line to the Sicilian throne, married Clemence, daughter of King Rudolf I of Germany. Jean was a member of the escort that received Clemence in Orvieto on 22 March to conduct her back to Sicily. The party remained in Orvieto for some weeks, and were joined in April by the king of Sicily, the groom's grandfather.

Orvieto had recently become the centre of the Papal court, since the Romans refused to accept the election of a pro-Angevin pope. The recently elected Martin IV was widely considered an Angevin puppet. He was crowned pope in Orvieto on 23 March, with Jean d'Eppe in attendance. On 24 March, acting on the advice of the king of Sicily, Martin appointed Jean as his rector in temporalibus (i.e., secular governor) in the Papal lands of the Romagna. On 26 March, he was granted supreme military command in the Romagna as well, with the ranks of master of the army (magister exercitus) and captain-general and the title Count of Romagna (comes Romandiolae).

== Papal rector of the Romagna ==
=== Campaign of 1281 ===
Jean's first task as Papal rector was to subdue the strongholds of Forlì and Cesena, which were being defended by Guido I da Montefeltro. To cover his personal expenses, Charles I authorized him to impose an extraordinary tax on his vassals in the Sicilian kingdom.

By 6 June 1281, Jean had assembled an army of 3,400 at Bologna. This included 800 men from France. The rest were drawn from the Papal State and from the Guelph parties in Tuscany and the March of Ancona. The Guelphs of Romagna under Taddeo da Montefeltro were also represented. Entering the Romagna, he took Faenza by bribing the local commander, Tebaldello Zambrasi. He also received the support of the lords of Modigliana and Castrocaro.

Following these quick successes, Jean sent messages to the city of Forlì, ordering them to throw out Guido and his supporters, and to Guido, offering to let him go if he would promise to leave the Romagna. These messages were ignored and Jean marched on Forlì. He camped at Villanova just outside the city and plundered the countryside from 22 until 27 June. He made several attempts to take the city by force, but all failed and he suffered such severe losses that he brought the entire army back to Faenza. Joined by Archbishop Bonifacio Fieschi of Ravenna and Guido da Polenta, lord of Ravenna, he then attacked the castle of Traversara. It resisted and on 8 July the army retreated again.

Following these failures, Jean asked Charles of Anjou to intervene with Martin IV to get him released from his command. Charles refused. On 4 September, he again attacked Forlì. On 16 September, Martin ordered Malatesta da Verucchio, lord of Rimini, to submit to Jean's authority and send him military reinforcements. On 17 September, Jean's troops plundered the villages of San Martino in Strada and Ponte di Ronco. Forlì continued to hold out against attack and on 19 September, Jean retreated again.

On 2 October, Martin ordered him to reduce his troops to the level necessary only for defending his gains. Before this was done, Jean launched one last unsuccessful attack on Forlì on 18 October. Following this, the infantry was sent back to Bologna, while cavalry was used to plunder of the suburbs of Cesena before the onset of winter. In a letter of 29 October, the pope congratulated Jean on his great "victory" at Cesena.

=== Campaign of 1282 ===
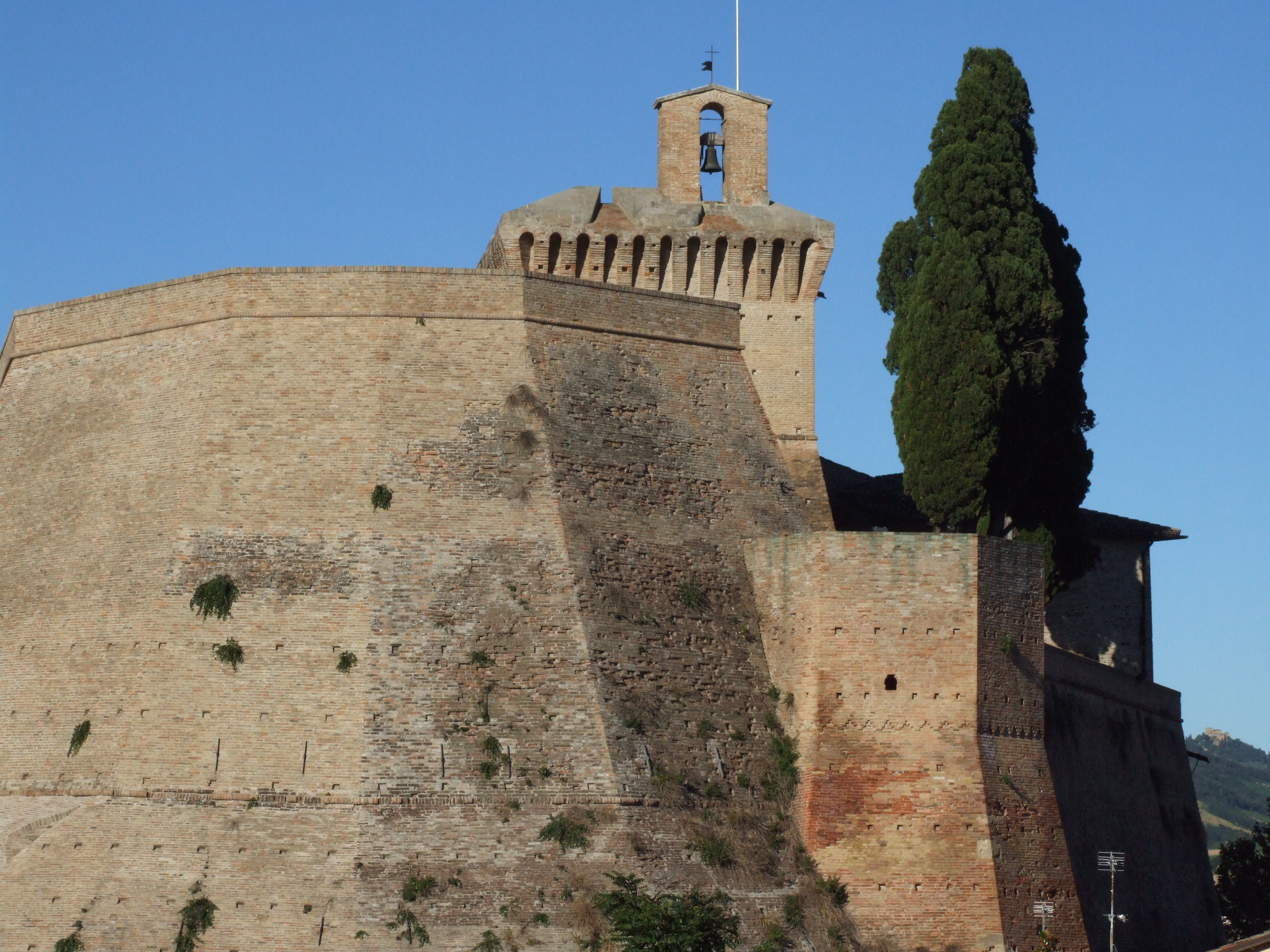
The castle of Meldola was besieged by Jean d'Eppe from August to November 1282.

In early 1282, Jean d'Eppe assembled a new army at Bologna composed of 1,700 Frenchmen sent by Charles of Anjou, 1,300 Bolognese and 500 soldiers from the Papal State. The French troops, however, made excessive demands on the Papal finances and the pope asked Charles to recall them on 3 March. On 16 March, the pope excommunicated Guido da Montefeltro and the other Ghibelline leaders in the Romagna. For this second campaign, Guido's cousin, Taddeo da Montefeltro, was Jean's captain-general.

On 30 April, some conspirators in Forlì offered to turn the city over to Jean, who immediately marched his men from Faenza to Forlì. Arriving the following day, he found that the conspiracy had been uncovered and the traitors arrested. Nonetheless, Jean launched an assault on the city. The main troops easily breached the outer wall. While they plundered the suburbs, Guido sent a small force out a gate on the opposite side of the city. In an ambush, this force overcame Jean's rearguard and surprised the main force. After a bloody battle, Jean was forced to retreat to Faenza.

The defeat at Forlì (1 May 1282), coming just a month after the Sicilian Vespers (30 March), was a great blow to Guelph morale. It was Jean's first defeat in the field (his other defeats having come against city walls). In response, he sent letters to the pope, to King Charles and to King Philip III of France requesting more troops. Charles, for his part, asked the pope to release his troops from Jean's army and send them to Sicily, where Charles needed them. The pope, however, refused.

Reinforced, Jean besieged the castle of Meldola to the south of Forlì on 6 August. The goal of the siege of Meldola was to cut off Forlì from its supplies, but Jean was unable to cut off Meldola from being resupplied from Forlì. In late November he called off the siege and on 9 December the pope ordered him to reduce his troops to just 300 Frenchmen and 200 Italians. The second campaigning season had ended in failure.

=== Parliament of 1283 ===
At the start of 1283, Jean adopted a different approach to reducing Ghibelline resistance in the Romagna. In February, he convoked a general parliament of the province at Imola. There, in the presence of the spiritual rector (rector in spritualibus), Guillaume Durand, and other provincial magnates, he promulgated a new provincial constitution of forty articles, the Constitutiones Romandiole, on 13 February. This document was apparently drafted in haste and without Papal approval. On 11 March, Martin IV removed Jean from his post and, on 23 March, he invalidated the parliament and the Constitutiones. Jean's successor as rector was Guy de Montfort, who had already been acting as Jean's captain-general. (Note: Guy apparently never took up his post, since on 27 June Jean was succeeded in fact by Guillaume Durand, who thus combined the offices of the spiritual and temporal rector. Guy ultimately abandoned the Papal cause.)

The Constitutiones, which were Jean's initiative, guaranteed all the immunities and liberties of the church, exempted all clergy from taxation, nullified all oaths of vassallage sworn to cities in rebellion (like Cesena and Forlì) and forbade anyone from trading or contracting with rebels. They also dealt with criminal prosecutions and appeals. They had an immediate effect on the Ghibelline opposition. In March, the city of Cervia surrendered, paid an indemnity of 1,600 florins and had its castle razed. Jean was still at the head of troops, awaiting the arrival of his replacement, when Forlì surrendered on 28 May. Its fortifications were razed. In June, Jean accepted the surrender of Cesena. His ultimate success as rector came not from his military ability but from his skillful political and diplomatic isolation of his opponents.

The city of Forlì was under intermittent siege from 1281 until 1283. Dante Alighieri in his Inferno made an oblique reference to it as la terra che fé già la lunga prova / e di Franceschi sanguinoso mucchio ("the city that underwent the long trial and made a bloody heap of the French"). Dante does not name the French leader (Jean), and although he places Guido da Montefeltro in the eighth bolgia of Hell, he was opposed to the French influence over the Papacy that came to a head under Martin IV.

== Captain-General in Maritime Campania ==
On 27 June 1283, perhaps surprised by Jean's victories after his dismissal, Martin IV appointed him rector in temporalibus of the city of Urbino and its diocese. Whether he ever took up his post in Urbino is unknown. In the spring, Charles of Anjou, now fighting an Aragonese invasion of Calabria, had requested that his troops in Jean's service be returned to him. Martin IV ignored this request until the Romagna was securely pacified. On 13 September 1283, he finally granted Jean permission to go with his men to the defence of Calabria. He quickly changed his mind, however. On 23 October 1283, he appointed Jean captain-general of the Papal forces in Maritime Campania.

Jean's task was to subdue the city of Frosinone, which had elected its own rector, Adinolfo di Mattia d'Anagni, to a term of twenty-five years without Papal approval. On 7 November, the syndics of the city surrendered. Before the end of the year, Jean had destroyed Adinolfo's main castle at Montelanico. In early March 1284, the last stronghold of Adinolfo's supporters, Zancati, surrendered. Jean had probably wrapped up campaigning by the start of May.

== War of the Vespers ==
=== Under Charles I ===
On 5 May 1284, Martin IV granted Jean his permission (placet) to take his troops into the Kingdom of Sicily. This is the last document to name Jean as captain-general in Maritime Campania. On 8 May, Charles of Salerno (acting as regent for his father since 12 January 1283) agreed to pay Jean's troops the same rates they had received from the Papacy. He also offered them three months' pay in advance. The army entered Sicily almost immediately, but as their advance was not forthcoming they turned around and were back in Maritime Campania by 16 May. Jean, however, as a vassal of the King of Sicily was called for service and he returned to Sicily on 18 May. Before leaving, he released his troops from service.

Jean remained in Sicilian service until the death of Charles of Anjou released him on 7 January 1285. He had held high office during this period on account of the vacancies that had been created by the Aragonese defeat of the Angevins at the Battle of the Gulf of Naples (5 June 1284), where many men of high rank, including Charles of Salerno, had been taken as prisoner. Jean had returned to Papal service by February 1285.

The death of Charles provided an opportunity for one of his old foes, Conrad of Antioch, a member of Staufer ruling house supported by Aragon, to invade the Abruzzo from Papal territory, where he held Anticoli. On 3 February 1285, Martin IV charged Jean d'Eppe, along with Giacomo Cantelmo and Amiel d'Agoult, the co-justiciars of the Abruzzo, with repelling Conrad's invasion. The details of the campaign are scarce, but before the end of the year Conrad had submitted to Martin's successor, Honorius IV.

=== Under Charles II ===
On the elder Charles's death, the younger Charles was still a prisoner of the Aragonese. Sicily was thus placed under the regency of Cardinal Gerardo Bianchi and Count Robert of Artois. There is no evidence that Jean worked for the regents in any capacity: his name does not once appear in an official document from this period. Only with the liberation of Charles of Salerno (now Charles II) in the spring of 1289 did Jean d'Eppe hold a public office again. On 27 August 1289, Charles appointed him and Anselme de Chevreuse in charge of arrangements for the knighting ceremony of the king's son, Charles Martel, which took place on 8 September.

Charles II granted Jean the fiefs of Sarno and Roseto and named him Captain-General of the Principato. In this capacity, it was his job to defend the coast from attacks by the Aragonese fleet and almogàver raids. On 2 August 1290, while Charles II was visiting Provence, he was summoned by the regents, Robert of Artois and Charles Martel, to attend a parliament at Eboli on 25 August. They're a series of capitula et statuta super regimine regni ("articles and statutes for the governance of the kingdom") were enacted. Jean was removed from his post in the Principato, but on 26 September he was sent along with Raynaut Gaulart and Count Hugh of Brienne to collect the subventio generalis (general subvention) and the adhoamentum (feudal relief) in Apulia, and to investigate the behaviour of Apulian officials to ensure compliance with the new capitula et statuta.

Jean was still overseeing the implementation of the decisions of the parliament of Eboli in Apulia during the first days of March 1291. On 7 March, however, he was ordered to transport 100 salme of grain from the house of the Knights Hospitaller in Barletta across the sea to Corfu. This done, on 16 April 1291, he was made Captain-General of the Terra di Lavoro and the Duchy of Amalfi. In this capacity, in the spring of 1292, he reinforced the garrisons of the castles under his command and brought their pay up to date, actions which required him to levy 120 oncie from the justiciar, Louis de Mons. In August 1292, he arranged an attack on Aragonese-occupied Castellabate, ultimately carried out by Tommaso di Sanseverino.

== Retirement and death ==
Jean's last appearance in a Sicilian document is dated 10 August 1292. He was by that time the seneschal of the kingdom and still Captain-General of the Terra di Lavoro and Amalfi. Shortly, therefore, for reasons unknown, he returned to France. By 19 June 1293, he had been replaced as seneschal by one Jean Scot. He died in his native village on 12 November, (Note: Or possibly some days later, since his tombstone indicates only that he died "the [blank] day after Martinmas" (11 November). The abbey's necrology dates his death to 3 June.) as attested by his tombstone in the Abbey of Saint-Vincent de Laon. His son, also named Jean, succeeded him in his fiefs in the Kingdom of Sicily. His lengthy Old French verse epitaph, now destroyed, read in part:

En Puille fu il et en Tunes Et en autres terres aucunes, Par sa force grand nom acquit, En Calabre moult d'armes fit, Et en Abrusse et en Romaine Pour l'amour Diu souffrit grant paine; Et ses faits qui tous les diroit A recorder trop long seroit ...	In Apulia he was and in Tunis And in other lands, By force he acquired a great name, In Calabria many feats of arms he did, And in Abruzzo and Romagna For the love of God he suffered great pain; And his feats all would say To record would take too long ...

The epitaph goes on to compare Jean favourably with Roland and Oliver, heroes of the Matter of France. The necrology of the abbey indicates by his title, "lord of Eppes" (dominus de Appia), that he succeeded his brother at some point. He left 21 livres to the abbey for a mass to be sung on the anniversary of his death and 40 livres for an annual mass for both him and his father to be sung "in low voice" (submissa voce).
