= 1350s =

Decade

The 1350s was a decade of the Julian Calendar which began on January 1, 1350, and ended on December 31, 1359.

== Events ==
=== January–December ===
- January 9 – Giovanni II Valente becomes Doge of Genoa.
- May 23 (possible date) – Hook and Cod wars in the County of Holland: A number of nobles and progressive cities supporting William V, Count of Holland, in his power struggle with his mother Margaret I, Countess of Holland, found the Cod League and perhaps sign the Cod Alliance Treaty.
- August 29 – Battle of Winchelsea (Les Espagnols sur Mer) off the south coast of England: An English fleet personally commanded by King Edward III defeats a Castilian fleet.
- September 5 – Hook and Cod wars in the County of Holland: Conservative noblemen found the Hook League and sign the Hook Alliance Treaty.
- November 17 – To pay for the expenses of the revived war with the Republic of Venice, the Republic of Genoa has to subscribe a loan at an interest rate of 10%, from an association of creditors known as the Compera imposita per gerra Venetorum.

=== Date unknown ===
- Hayam Wuruk becomes ruler of the Majapahit Empire.
- The Punta Lobos massacre is carried out by members of the powerful Chimu Empire in Peru, leaving a residue of 200 murders.
- The Black Death first appears in Scotland and Sweden.
- The castle of Rapperswil is largely destroyed by Rudolf Brun, mayor of the city of Zürich.

=== January–December ===
- January 14 – Edward III of England institutes the Treason Act 1351, defining treason in English law. It remains unrepealed into the 21st century.
- February 2 – Hook and Cod wars: William of Bavaria, aspirant to the title of Count of Holland, is rescued from imprisonment at Burbant Castle in Ath by Gerard van Herlaar and Gerard van Merxem, and joins the Cod faction.
- February 9 – The English Parliament is opened by King Edward III of England for a 20-day session.
- March 1 – The English Parliament adjourns after 20 days and the laws passed during that time are given royal assent by King Edward III, including the Statute of Labourers Act to respond to the shortage of labour shortage caused by the Black Death, and the Statute of Provisors to prevent the Pope from appointing clergy to English benefices.
- March 4 – The Ayutthaya Kingdom is established by King Uthong (Ramathibodi I) in modern-day Thailand. He begins to propagate Theravada Buddhism as the state religion.
- March 23 – Firuz Shah Tughlaq succeeds Mohammad Tughlaq as ruler of the Delhi Sultanate. At this time, the Samma dynasty in Sindh (part of modern-day Pakistan) breaks away from the Sultanate.
- March 26 – War of the Breton Succession: Combat of the Thirty – Thirty chosen knights each, from the Kingdoms of France and England, fight to determine who will rule the Duchy of Brittany; a Franco-Breton victory is assured by the squire Guillaume de Montauban.
- April 1 – Hundred Years' War: Battle of Saintes. – The French are defeated by the English.
- April 8 – Hundred Years' War: Battle of Taillebourg. – The French are defeated by the English.
- May 1 – The Canton of Zürich becomes the fifth member state of the Swiss Confederacy as the citizens of Zurich swear allegiance to the Confederacy in fron of representatives of the cantons of Lucerne, Schwyz, Uri and Unterwalden. Rudolf Brun, Mayor of Zurich, signs a treaty of allegiance with Johann von Attinghausen of the Confederacy.
- May 30 – Hook and Cod wars: The four-day Battle of Veere, fought between the Hook faction of Margaret, Countess of Holland and the Cod faction of William V, her son and challenger to the title, is won by the Hooks, giving the Hooks control of the county of Zeeland.
- July 4 – Hook and Cod wars: The forces of Countess Margaret of Holland]], are defeated by those of William of Bavaria, at the naval battle of Zwartewaal on the Oude Maas of the Rhine river.
- October 4 – Hook and Cod wars: The siege of Geertruidenberg Castle, occupied by a member of the Hook faction, Philips I, Lord of Polanen,is started by John IV, Lord of Arkel of the Cod faction. The siege will continue for 10 months before Polanen's surrender on August 15, 1352.
- November 26 – Emperor Sukō abdicates as 3rd Emperor of the Northern Court of Japan.

=== Date unknown ===
- The Red Turban Rebellions break out in China, leading to permanent weakening of the Mongolian-run Yuan dynasty.
- King Gongmin ascends the throne in Goryeo.
- The region of Vantaa in Finland is first mentioned (as Helsinge).

=== January–March ===
- January 6 – The Order of the Star (Ordre de l'Étoile), the first military order in French history founded as an order of chivalry founded on November 6, 1351 by King Jean II of France, is bestowed for the first time, in a ceremony at Saint-Ouen-sur-Seine.
- January 7 – Following a rebellion of peasants in the Swiss canton of Valais against Guichard Tavel, the Roman Catholic bishop of Sion, Pope Clement VI issues an order of excommunication against any participants, after which troops gather in March at Saint-Maurice to crush the rebellion.
- January 13 – The English Parliament assembles at Westminster for a 29-day session, after being summoned by King Edward on November 15.
- February 11 – The English Parliament adjourns after a four-week session and laws passed therein take effect, including the Treason Act 1351, titled "A Declaration which Offences shall be adjudged Treason". The Act, given royal assent by King Edward III, codifies the common law offenses considered to be treason against the Crown.
- February 13 – War of the Straits – The Battle of the Bosporus is fought in a stormy sea into the night between the Genoese, Venetian, Aragonese, and Byzantine fleets. The Genoese emerge victorious, as the other fleets withdraw.
- February 16 – Red Turban Rebellions: Buddhist rebels against China's Yuan dynasty capture the city of Haozhou. The Yuan Chinese army sends raiders to raid monasteries in what is now the Anhui province, and burns down the temple monastery where the peasant Zhu Yuanzhang is studying Buddhist texts, prompting the future Emperor to join the Red Turbans two months later.
- March 3 – Less than three weeks after his victory at the Battle of the Bosporous, Genoese Admiral Paganino Doria, attempts to renew the fighting by ordering the survivng ships of Venice and Aragon to leave the area. In that all the navies are still recuperating from their losses, the Venetians and Aragonese stay in place. Doria declines to confront them and the Genoese ships anchor on the Asian side of the strait as guests of the Ottoman Sultan Orhan.
- March 23 – Louis I of Naples receives formal recognition by Pope Clement VI of the right to be co-ruler of Naples alongside his wife, Queen Joanna, whom he had married, without dispensation from the Pope, on August 22, 1347.

=== April–June ===
- April 5 – Southern Japanese troops led by Kitabatake Akiyoshi, Kusunoki Masanori and Chigusa Akitsune capture and occupy Kyoto, capital of Northern Japan. The Southern troops capture the Northern Emperor Sukō and the Crown Prince Tadahito as prisoners back to Tokyo, along with the retired Northern Emperor Kōgon and Emperor Kōmyō. The invaders install Imperial Prince Iyahito, son of Kogon, as emperor. The shogun Ashikaga Yoshiakira is called by the Northern nobles to rescue the city.
- April 15 – The peasant Zhu Yuanzhang joins the Red Turbans and serves under the command of Guo Zixing. Zhu will rise rapidly in rank and, with in three years, command an army of 30,000 rebels. By 1356, four years after having been a peasant, Zhu becomes the Emperor Hongwu of China and founds the Ming dynasty
- April 25 – The shogun Ashikaga Yoshiakira and his troops recapture Kyoto from the Southern enemy.
- April 27 – Pope Clement VI agrees with the Visconti family of Milan to give them control of church properties in northern Italy, and agrees to recognize the takeover of Bologna by the Archbishop Giovanni Visconti.
- May 6 – The Byzantine Empire, lea by John VI Kantakouzenos, signs a treaty with the Republic of Genoa] to cease hostilities in the War of the Straits. Genoa's right to possess its Black Sea port of Galata is recognized by Byzantium, which also bars ships from the Republic of Venice and from the Kingdom of Aragon from its ports.
- May 27 – The second coronation of Queen Joanna of Naples (Giovanna di Napoli) takes place in conjunction with the crowning of her husband Louis of Taranto (Luigi di Taranto) as the co-ruler and King of Naples. The coronation of Louis proceeds after Pope Clement VI gives his approval of the 1347 marriage of Joanna and Louis.
- June 4 – The Canton of Glarus joins the Old Swiss Confederacy.
- June 27 – The Canton of Zug joins the Old Swiss Confederacy.

=== July–September ===
- July 2 – A treaty of alliance is executed between the Kingdom of France and the Crown of Castile, along with a contract for King Pedro II of Castile to marry Blanche of Bourbon, the 14-year-old French daughter of Pierre, Duke of Bourbon, in order to secure the agreement.King Jean II of France ratifies the agreement on July 7, and King Pedro and Blanche marry 11 months later on June 3, 1353, after which Pedro deserts his new bride.
- August 18 – The long siege of Geertruidenberg castle, which had started 10 months earlier on October 4, 1351, ends after more than 10 months as the castle owner, Philips I of Polanen, surrenders the castle to the Cod faction led by John IV, Lord of Arkel, and the defenders are allowed free passage and the right to take their own personal items with them.
- September 25 – Emperor Go-Kōgon becomes 4th Emperor of the Northern Court of Japan.

=== October–December ===
- October 10 – The Byzantine Emperor John V Palaiologos signs a treaty with the Republic of Venice, ceding the Aegean Sea island of Tenedos to Venice in return for financial assistance.
- October – Byzantine civil war of 1352–1357 – Battle of Demotika: Fighting as allies of John VI Kantakouzenos, the Ottoman beylik scores its first victory on European soil, against the Serbs.
- November 4 – King Pedro II of Castile signs the marriage contract agreeing to marry Blanche of Bourbon.
- November 7 – Corpus Christi College is founded as a College of the University of Cambridge in England, by the Guilds of Corpus Christi and the Blessed Virgin Mary.
- December 6 – Pope Clement VI dies at Avignon, and 25 of the 26 living Roman Catholic Cardinals travel to the Palais des Papes in France to elect his successor.
- December 16 – The conclave of 25 cardinals begins at Avignon, and for the first time in the history of the papacy, the cardinals agree to a "conclave capitulation", limiting the powers of whomever is elected as the next Pope. Under the 1352 agreement, the cardinals agree that no new people will be elected to the College of Cardinals until their number decreases from 26 to 16, and that the College will be limited to only 20 cardinals. The parties agree also that two-thirds of the cardinals will need to approve changes in the rules of the College, that all revenue to the papacy will be shared with the cardinals, and that the cardinals will have veto power over papal decisions. Despite his agreement to the capitulation, the new pope will declare it invalid on July 6, 1353, less than seven months after his election.
- December 18 – Cardinal Étienne Aubert of France, the Roman Catholic Bishop of Ostia, is unanimously elected as the 199th pope at the end of the three-day conclave. He takes the regnal name Pope Innocent VI and is crowned on December 30 as the 199th pope at the cathedral of Notre Dame des Doms.

=== Date unknown ===
- Süleyman Pasha (son of Orhan) is probably granted control of Çimpe Castle on the Gallipoli peninsula by Emperor John VI Kantakouzenos, the first territory west of the Bosporus held by the Ottoman Empire.

=== January–March ===
- January 5 – At Viangchan, Chao Fa Ngum founds the Kingdom of Lan Xang (now Laos), beginning a dynasty that rules for more than 350 years until the kingdom breaks up in 1707. The city survives as Vientiane, capital of the Lao People's Democratic Republic.
- January 20 – (13 Dhu al-Hijjah 753 AH) Malik Ibrahim Bayu, Afghan general and Governor of Bihar in the Sultanate of Delhi during the reign of the Sultan Firoz Shah Tughlaq, is assassinated outside the Rohtasgarh fort.
- January – (Dhu al-Hijjah 754 AH), Thaqabah ibn Rumaythah, Emir of Mecca is removed from office by the Mamluk Egyptian Emir Umar Shah, who arrests Thaqabah and restores Thaqabah's brother Ajlan ibn Rumaythah to the throne.
- February 15 – The town of Alghero, located on the island of Sardinia, submits to the rule of the Republic of Genoa in order to be protected from the Kingdom of Aragon.
- March 1 – King Edward III of England signs the Treaty of Westminster to end the War of the Breton Succession. England agrees to recognize Charles of Blois as Duke of Brittany in return for the payment of 300,000 crowns and an alliance with England against France.
- March 3 – The Canton of Bern signs an alliance with the Old Swiss Confederacy.

=== April–June ===
- April 27 – Ivan the Fair of the Rurik dynasty, becomes the new ruler of the Principality of Moscow and the Grand Principality of Vladimir controlling much of Russia, upon the death of his older brother, the Grand Duke Simeon the Proud, who has died of the Black Death plague.
- May 21 – At the age of 14, Anna von Schweidnitz marries Karl of Luxembourg, King of Bohemia, King of the Romans and King of Germany, three months after the February 21 death of his first wife, the Queen Consort Anne of Bavaria. Anna becomes Queen Consort of Bohemia and of Germany, and later becomes the Holy Roman Empress when Karl is elected as the new Emperor.
- June 20 – Elisabeta Kotromanić, daughter of the ruler of Bosnia, Stjepan II of Bosnia, marries King Lajos of Hungary and Croatia in a ceremony at the Hungarian capital, Buda and becomes the Queen consort.

=== July–September ===
- July 28 – Anna von Schweidnitz is crowned as the Queen of Bohemia by Archbishop Arnošt of Pardubice in a ceremony at Prague.
- August 27 – War of the Straits and Sardinian–Aragonese war – At the Battle of Alghero, the allied Aragonese and Venetian fleets crush the Genoese fleet, most of which is captured.
- September 22 – Zayn al-Din Qaraja, the former Bey of Dulkadir at what is now southeastern Turkey, is deported by order of Ghiyath al-Din Muhammad, Sultan of the Eretnid dynasty of Anatolia and sent to the Mamluk Sultanate of Egypt and Syria. Qaraja had come to the Eretnid capital of Kayseri to seek asylum after failing in an abortive uprising against Egypt. In return for 500,000 dinars, Ghiyath Muhammad sends Qaraja, in chains, to Cairo. As-Salih Salih, Sultan of Egypt, has Qaraja executed on December 11.

=== October–December ===
- October 9 – The Republic of Genoa, led by the Doge Giovanni II Valente, and unable to pay its wartime expenses, agrees to submit to the rule of the Lord of Milan, Archbishop Giovanni Visconti.
- November 8 – Francesco di Petracco, Italian poet known in English as Petrarch, delivers a speech before the Great Council of the Republic of Venice, to prevent a war between Venice and the Republic of Genoa and the Lordship of Milan. While averting a war, Petrarch's speech ruins a plan for forging an alliance against the Visconti family.
- December 14 – (14 Dhu'l-Qa'da 754 AH) Togha Temür, Mongol conqueror of provinces of Persia, is assassinated by Khwaja Ahia Kiratí, chief of the Sarbadáls.

=== Date unknown ===
- The Moroccan traveler Ibn Battuta makes the first recorded visit to Timbuktu and Kabara, when returning from a stay in the capital of the Mali Empire.
- The Decameron is finished by Giovanni Boccaccio.

=== January–March ===
- January 8 – Charles de la Cerda, the Constable of France, the highest of the Grands officiers serving King Jean II, is assassinated in Normandy in the town of L'Aigle on orders of King Carlos II of Navarre.
- January 21 – At Heian-kyō (now Kyoto, the Emperor Go-Kōgon is enthroned in Japan as the Northern Emperor, although he had ruled northern Japan since the 1352 after the death of his older brother, the Emperor Sukō. In southern Japan at Tokyo, where Go-Kōgon claims rule as pretender to the Chrysanthemum Throne, the Emperor Go-Murakami is in his 15th year as the recognized ruler of the Empire.
- February 12 – The Treaty of Stralsund settles border disputes between the duchies of Mecklenburg and Pomerania.
- March 2 – A strong earthquake destroys the city of Gallipoli and its city walls, weakening its defenses, along with destroying the neighboring villages and towns in the area. Within a month after the devastating earthquake the Ottomans besiege and capture the town, making Gallipoli the first Ottoman stronghold in Europe and the staging area for Ottoman expansion across the Balkans.
- March 15 – King Edward III summons the English Parliament, directing them to meet in Westminster on April 28.

=== April–June ===
- April 6 – The Treaty of Guînes is signed in France between representatives of the kingdoms of England and France, after the dispute between the two kingdoms is mediated by Pope Innocent VI and Cardinal Guy of Boulogne in an effort to end the Hundred Years' War. The "treaty of perpetual peace" is never ratified.
- April 10 – Four days after the signing of an agreement to end the Hundred Years War, the armies of England and France fight the Battle of Montmuran in the course of the Breton War of Succession between the House of Montfort (supported by England) and the House of Blois (supported by France).
- April 19 – At Srinagar, now in the Jammu and Kashmir state of India, Shihabu'd-Din Shah becomes the new Sultan of Kashmir, succeeding his late father, Alauddin Shah.
- April 28 – The 31st parliament of King Edward III opens a three-week session.
- May 20 – The English Parliament adjourns after passing multiple acts, and King Edward III gives royal assent to the Liberty of Subject Act 1354, still in force providing that "No person shall be condemned without his answer," an early statement of the right to due process of law, as well as the Lords of Marches of Wales Act (directing that nobles shall be "attendant to the crown of England, and not to the principality of Wales"; and the Exportation of Iron Act ("No iron shall he carried forth of the realm."
- June 10 – In Cairo, Sarim al-Din Ibrahim, ruler of the Ramadanid Emirate in what is now the Anatolia region of Turkey, makes a gift of 1,000 horses to the Mamluk Sultan of Egypt and is given recognition as the "Emir of the Turkomans". Yinanç, Refet (1988). Dulkadir Beyliği (in Turkish). Ankara: Turkish Historical Society Press. p. 19.
- June 22 – The siege of Alghero, located on the island of Sicily, begins as King Pedro IV of Aragon arrives on the island's coast with 100 ships and 12,000 men
- June – In what is now Laos, Fa Ngum is crowned as King of Lan Xang at Vientiane.

=== July–September ===
- July 13 – Scotland and England reach an agreement for the release of King David II of Scotland, who been taken as a prisoner of war in battle at Neville's Cross, near Durham, on October 17, 1353. Under the terms of the treaty, the Scots agree to pay a ransom of 90,000 merks sterling (equivalent to 30.25 kilograms (1,067 oz) of silver), in nine annual installments, and 20 hostages "of noble birth" (primarily sons of 20 nobles) are to be sent to England in exchange for King David until the balance of the ransom is paid off.
- August 16 – War of the Straits: The Venetian-ruled town of Poreč is sacked by the Genoese under Paganino Doria, who carry off the relics of saints Eleutherius and Maurus of Parentium to Genoa, where they were deposited at the church of San Matteo.
- September 11 – Marino Faliero is elected as the new Doge of the Republic of Venice, four days after the death of the Doge Andrea Dandolo.

=== October–December ===
- October 8 – Cola di Rienzo, self-proclaimed "tribune" of Rome, is killed by an angry mob.
- November 4 – War of the Straits: The Genoese fleet under Paganino Doria defeats and captures the entire Venetian fleet under Niccolò Pisani at the Battle of Sapienza.
- November 29 – Sava IV becomes the new Patriarch of the Serbian Orthodox Christian Church after the September 3 death of the Partriarch Joanikije II.
- December 10 – The reign of John VI Kantakouzenos as Byzantine Emperor is ended, after John V Palaiologos retakes Constantinople and is restored as sole emperor.

=== Date unknown ===
- After 24 years of struggling for independence, since the Battle of Posada, Nicholas Alexander of Wallachia becomes a vassal to Hungarian king Louis I.
- Early in the year, Ibn Battuta returns from his travels at the command of Abu Inan Faris, sultan of Morocco, who appoints a scribe to write an account of the adventures.

=== January–March ===
- January 10 – The first 23 articles of the Golden Bull of 1356 are issued at Nuremberg by the Imperial Diet of the Holy Roman Empire as a constitution of the Empire.
- January 20 – Edward Balliol surrenders his title as King of Scotland, to Edward III of England.
- January 26 – Burnt Candlemas: King Edward III of England begins an invasion of the Kingdom of Scotland by land and by sea, seven days before the February 2 celebration of "Candlemas" and his army of 13,000 men marches into the Lothian region, with plans to take the Scottish capital, Edinburgh. The Scots begin a scorched earth policy, evacuating the towns in the path of King Edward's troops and destroying territory to keep the invaders from having access to food. The English troops arrive in Edinburgh in early February and begin burning the city. In the middle of February, a winter gale scatters the English Royal Navy, sinks several ships, and prevents the English from being resupplied.
- February 2 – The Hanseatic League, a trading alliance between many cities in northern Europe, first meets, convening at Lübeck with representatives from cities in Saxony (led by Lübeck), from Westphalia and the Rhein (led by Dortmund), and from Sweden and Lithuania (led by Visby)
- February 25 – To celebrate the conclusion of the meeting of the representatives of the Hanseatic League, the Matthiae-Mahl feast is celebrated the first time, and will continue to be observed more than 650 years later as the world's oldest ceremonial meal.
- March 10 – English troops in France capture the city of Bétaille.
- March 12 – Rudolf II of Saxe-Wittenberg becomes the new Elector of Saxony, one of the member nations of the Holy Roman Empire upon the death of his father, the Elector Rudolf I, who had ruled for 57 years.
- March 17 – The Yuan Chinese city of Zhenjiang falls to General Xu Da, an ally of Zhu Yuanzhang in the Red Turban Rebellion.

=== April–June ===
- April 5 – In the city of Rouen in France, where the major nobles of Normandy are refusing to pay further taxes for the French war effort, King Jean II arrives with supporters at a banquet where the nobles are dining at the invitation of the Dauphin Charles, King Jean's oldest son. After listening to the complaints of the nobles, King Jean orders 10 of the most outspoken of them to be arrested, including King Carlos II of Navarre. Four of the leaders are quickly beheaded, while King Carlos is imprisoned in Paris.
- April 10 – Zhu Yuanzhang, a leader of the Red Turban Rebellion, captures the city of Nanjing from the Mongol-led Yuan dynasty in China, and renames it Yingtian. From then on, Nanjingbecomes his base of power, and the capital of the Ming dynasty which he will establish in 1368 as the Hongwu Emperor.
- April 18 – A truce is agreed upon between England and Scotland after King Edward's troops have retreated back across the border to the English town of Carlisle.
- May 9 – Gautier of Brienne, the self-styled Duke of Athens and former ruler of the Republic of Florence, is appointed Constable of France by King Jean II. As part of his duties as the foremost of the Great Officers of the Crown of France and commander of the French Army. Brienne holds the office for four months before being killed on September 15 at the Battle of Poitiers.
- May 14 – Responding to the invasion of France by the Kingdom of England and the Kingdom of Navarre, King Jean II announces an arrière-ban, a call-to-arms for all able-bodied French men and boys to join the French Army. The appeal is generally ignored by the citizens, as are similar calls-to-arms later in the month and again in early June.
- June 13 – (13 Jumada al-Akhir 757 AH) Ajlan ibn Rumaythah is temporarily deposed as Emir of the Sharifate of Mecca (now in Saudi Arabia) by his brother Thaqabah ibn Rumaythah. When the Hajj, the pilgrimage of Muslims to the holy city of Mecca, begins in November, Ajilan returns and Thaqabah is forced to flee to Yemen.
- June 17 – The city of Lwów is granted Magdeburg rights by Casimir III the Great, King of Poland. The advantages of the rights are not only economic, but also political.

=== July–September ===
- July 5 – The siege of Breteuil, started by French forces against Navarrese occupiers of the city in April, is interrupted by the chevauchée of Normandy, led by the English commander Henry of Lancaster. During his interruption of France's siege, Lancaster resupplies the city of Breteuil. The city surrenders on August 20.
- August 20 – Edward, the Black Prince, eldest son of King Edward III of England and heir to the throne, begins the siege of Romorantin and forces the surrender of the town after six days.
- August 29 – Edward, the Black Prince, eldest son of King Edward III of England and heir to the throne, begins the siege of Romorantin and forces the surrender of the town after six days.
- September 19 – Hundred Years' War – Battle of Poitiers: The English, commanded by Edward the Black Prince, defeat the French. The greatly outnumbered English forces not only rout the French, but capture the French king John II of France and his youngest son, the future Philip the Bold of Burgundy.

=== October–December ===
- October 17 – Erik XII proclaims himself king of Sweden, in opposition to his father, King Magnus IV. Thus begins a civil war in Sweden between father and son, which will last until Erik's death in 1359.
- October 18 (St Luke's Day) – The Basel earthquake affects northern Switzerland, with a maximum MSK intensity of IX–X (Destructive–Devastating), leaving around 1,000 dead. It is the most damaging intraplate earthquake known to have occurred in central Europe.
- November 15 – Simone Boccanegra takes office as the Doge of the Republic of Genoa, an office that had been vacant since the republic had come under the control of the Visconti family of the Lordship of Milan in 1353.
- November 17 – In the Holy Roman Empire, the Diet of Metz, the imperial parliament with representatives from all the member electorates, principalities and duchies of the federation, is opened by Charles IV, Holy Roman Emperor. The session lasts for more than seven weeks session at Metz, at the time the capital of the semi-independent Republic of Metz and now part of France, and lasts. until January 7.
- December 25 – Charles IV, Holy Roman Emperor, promulgates the Golden Bull and the last eight of 31 articles as a constitution for his empire.

=== Date unknown ===
- Sweden's first guild privileges (for tailors) are issued in Stockholm.
- Ghazan II replaces Anushirwan as ruler of the Ilkhanate in Persia.
- The majority of the Great Pyramid of Giza's limestone casing stones are removed by Bahri Sultan An-Nasir Hasan, to build fortresses and mosques in the nearby city of Cairo, leaving the first of the Seven Wonders of the Ancient World in the step-stone condition in which it remains into modern times.
- The Castelvecchio Bridge in Verona is probably completed this year; its main span of 48.7 m (160 ft) is the world's longest arch at this time.

=== January–March ===
- January 7 – The Diet of Metz, which had been convened in the French city by the Holy Roman Emperor Charles V on November 17, is closed after two months.
- February 3 – The Estates General in France meets and passes Étienne Marcel's Great Ordinance in an attempt to impose limits on the monarchy, in particular in fiscal and monetary matters.
- February 15 – King Edward III summons the English Parliament and directs its members to assemble at Westminster on April 17, 1357.
- March 16 – Brancaleone Doria of the Republic of Genoa, who will gain control of most of the island of Sardinia, agrees to become a vassal of King Pedro of Aragon, the nominal King of Sardinia, in order to be recognized as owner of the Doria ancestral lands and castles of northern Sardinia, and the lordships of Castelgenovese, Monteleone, Castel Doria, Nucara, Cabuabbbas, Anglona and Bisarcio.
- March 21 – ("first day of the third month of the 17th year of the Zhizheng era", the third month corresponding to March 21 to April 19, 1357) The Ispah rebellion by Persian Shia Muslims in Yuan dynasty China begins. Rebels led by Sayf ad-Din and Amir ad-Din take control of the city.
- March 23 – Edward the Black Prince, who has been residing in France with his men at English-controlled Bordeaux and is the eldest son of King Edward III of England, concludes a two-year truce with France in order to be able to return home after the Battle of Poitiers.

=== April–June ===
- April 6 – King Jean II of France, acting from his imprisonment at Bordeaux, overules the Great Ordinance that had been approved on February 3 by the Estates General.
- April 17 – The English Parliament assembles at Westminster for a 29-day session.
- April 28 – Erik Magnusson is recognized as king of most of Sweden, in opposition to his father, King Magnus. The action takes place at a meeting of the Swedish nobility at Jönköping, and Erik is granted control of Finland, Scania, the southern half of Halland, and other parts of the Kingdom of Sweden.
- May 17 – The English Parliament adjourns and King Edward III gives royal assent to numerous acts of legislation passed, including a confirmation of the Great Charter and the Charter of the Forest, including regulations for the sale and pricing of dogger-fish and for herrings, the Default of Victuallers in London Act, regulations defining the measurement and the contents of a tun (252 wine gallons, now equivalent to 954 liters).
- May 24 – Edward the Black Prince returns to London in triumph with his prisoner of war from the Battle of Poitiers, King Jean II of France.
- May 28 – King Pedro the Just becomes King of Portugal, after the death of his father, King Afonso the Brave.
- June 4 – The War of the Brabantian Succession, a conflict over the successor to the late Jan III of the Duchy of Brabant, comes to an end almost a year after it began on June 15, 1356, when the Peace of Ath is signed between the belligerents after being brokered by Willem III, Count of Hainaut.

=== July–September ===
- July 9 – Construction formally begins on Charles Bridge in Prague.
- July 22 – On the death of Jani Beg, he is succeeded as Khan of the Blue Horde by his son Berdi Beg who orders the death of at least 12 of his close kinsmen to secure his position.
- July 26 – (8 Sha'ban 758 AH) A Mamluk assassin attacks Sheikh Al-Omari Al-Nasiri, the chief minister of the Sultan Al-Nasir Hasan of Egypt, and severely injures him with a sword.
- August 15 – What is now the Principality of Monaco comes under the control of the Republic of Genoa and the Geonese Doge Simone Boccanegra, upon the death of the Lord Charles of the House of Grimaldi. Boccanegra removes the co-ruler, Antoine Grimaldi, from office.
- September 26 – The Scottish Parliament approves the agreement to pay a ransom for the return of King David II.

=== October–December ===
- October 3 – The Treaty of Berwick ends the Second War of Scottish Independence and King David II of Scotland is released by the English in return for a ransom of 100,000 marks at a rate of 10,000 marks per year for ten years.
- November 6 – Meeting at Scone, the Scottish Parliament votes to ratify the Treaty of Berwick and King David II returns home after 11 years.
- November 9 – King Carlos II of Navarre, held prisoner in Paris by King Jean II of France after being arrested on April 5, 1356, is rescued from his cell at the Arleux Castle in an operation by 30 men under the guidance of Jean de Picquigny, Viceroy of Languedoc.
- November 21 – (26 Dhu'l-Qa'da 758 AH) Sheikh Al-Omari Al-Nasiri dies from his injuries four months after being wounded by an assassin.
- December 15 – King Edward III summons the English Parliament and directs its members to assemble at Westminster on February 5.

=== Date unknown ===
- The Blue Horde unseats Ghazan II as the ruler of the Il-Khanate, and appoints their own governor.
- Battle of Bubat: The Sundanese royal family is massacred by the Majapahit Army on the orders of Gajah Mada; the death toll includes Sundanese King Lingga Buana and Princess Dyah Pitaloka Citraresmi, who commits suicide.
- Rao Kanhadev becomes Rathore ruler of Marwar (part of modern-day India).
- Construction started on Charles Bridge in Prague.
- Influenza is first identified as a disease.
- The first public exhibition of the Shroud of Turin is recorded.
- The Wat Phra Si Rattana Mahathat (Famous Wat Yai) Temple is constructed in Phitsanulok, Thailand.

=== January–March ===
- January 10 – Abu Inan Faris, Sultan of Morocco of the Marinid dynasty is assassinated in a conspiracy by his vizier, Faris bin Maymum, who has the Sultan strangled to death. Muhammad II ibn Faris becomes the new Sultan briefly before being replaced by Abu Bakr ibn Faris
- February 11 – At Kalaburagi (now located in the Karnataka state of India), Mohammed Shah I becomes Bahmani Sultan of Deccan after the death of Sultan Ala-ud-Din Bahman Shah.
- February 18 – The Treaty of Zadar is signed between the Kingdom of Croatia and the Republic of Venice: The Venetians lose influence over their former Dalmatian holdings.
- February 23 – Albert of Wittelsbach, Duke of Bavaria, is appointed as the Holy Roman Empire's regent for Holland, and soon given control of Hainaut, and Zeeland, and assigned to suppress rebellions within what is now the Netherlands during the ongoing Hook and Cod wars.
- March 16 – King Haakon VI of Norway designates the city of Skien as a city with trading privileges, making it the sixth town with city status in Norway.

=== April–June ===
- April 6 – A peace conference opens in Milan with participation by nearly all of the Italian kingdoms, republics and city states to discuss a war between a league of cites nadd Milan.
- May 8 – The First Treaty of London is signed at Windsor Castle between King Edward III of England and King Jean II of France, who has been held prisoner of war in England since 1356. Under the terms of the treaty, the ransom for King Jean II and other prisoners of war retained as hostages is set at four million écus, to be paid in six annual installments. France also agrees to cede one-fourth of its territory to England, and King Edward III renounces his claims to the throne of France. The amount of 4,000,000 écus represents most of France's income and payment proves to be financially impossible, leading to a renegotiation of the terms after France is unable to make its first payment on November 1.
- May 28 – Hundred Years' War: The Jacquerie – A peasant rebellion begins in France, which consumes the Beauvais, and allies with Étienne Marcel's seizure of Paris. Over the three weeks that follow, the angry peasants, angry about the devastation caused in the and around Paris by the Kingdom of Navarre, murder members of the French nobility, destroy castles, and commit numerous atrocities.
- June 8 – After two months of negotiations, the treaty of Sant'Ambrogio is signed in Milan with Novara and Alba returned to the Visconti family and Asti and Pavia being kept by the Marquis of Montferrat.
- June 10 – The Jacquerie rebellion is brutally suppressed by French troops.
- June 17 – Androin de la Roche abandons his two-month siege of the city of Forli.
- June 27 – The Republic of Ragusa is founded in what is now Croatia, after being freed from the Republic of Venice by the Treaty of Zadar.

=== July–September ===
- July 10 – Battle of Mello: The Jacquerie rebellion is defeated by a coalition of nobles, led by Charles II of Navarre.
- July 25 – De la Roche captures Meldola after a 24-day siege.
- August 22 – Pietro Badoer of the Republic of Venice is named as the Duke of Crete, Venice's governor over the nominally independent Kingdom of Candia.
- September 1 – A Teutonic knight, Bonifacius Rotarius of Asti, becomes the first person known to have climbed to the top of the 11,608 feet (3,538 m) high mountain Rocciamelone, in the Italian Alps, bringing with him a small image of the Virgin Mary as a gesture of gratitude for having survived captivity in the Holy Land during a crusade against the Muslims, and begin an annual tradition of Catholics making a pilgrimage to the summit of Rocciamelone every August 5.
- September 21 – Badoer, Duke of Crete, meets with an ambassador sent from the Emirate of Menteshe to discuss trade between the two nations.
- September 29 – Przemyslaus I Noszak become the new Duke of Teschen (now in Poland) upon the death of his father, Casimir I of Cieszyn.

=== October–December ===
- October 12 – Hook and Cod wars: On orders of Albert, Duke of Holland, Dirk Loef of Horne provides 30 archers to aid in Albert's siege of Heusden, a rebellious city in the Netherlands, and the city surrenders in January.
- October 13 – Badoer, on behalf of Crete, signs a treaty of peace and trade with the Emirate of Menteshe, located in western Turkey and ruled by the Emir Musa.
- November 1 – France defaults on its obligation to pay 600,000 écus as the first installment on the 4,000,000 écus owed to England under the First Treaty of London.
- November 24 – Hugh IV, King of Cyprus since 1324, abdicates and his son Peter I becomes the new monarch.
- December 4 – Hook and Cod wars: Albert, Duke of Bavaria, begins the siege of Heemskerk Castle after an unsuccessful ambush against Reinoud I van Brederode by rebels. Heemskerk surrenders after almost four months, on March 24, 1359.

=== Date unknown ===
- Mubariz al-Din Muhammad, leader of the Arab Muzaffarid tribe, expels the Blue Horde from Ilkhanate territory in Persia. The Muzaffarid then release control of the Il-Khanate, after being marched on by the Mongol Jalayirid tribe, ruled by Shaikh Uvais. Shaikh Uvais becomes the new Il-Khan. The Ilkhanate is effectively now disbanded, and replaced by the Jalayirid dynasty of Persia.
- Shah Shuja overthrows his father, Mubarazuddin Muhammad, as leader of the Muzaffarid tribe.
- Estimation: Nanjing in Yuan China becomes the largest city of the world, taking the lead from Hangzhou in Yuan China.

=== January–March ===
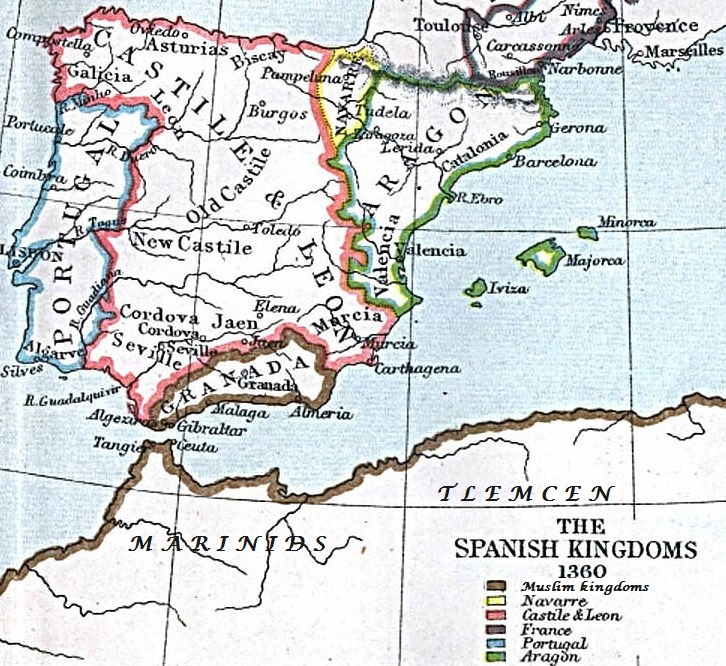
The various kingdoms in Iberia and Spain in 1359

- January 9 – The Zayanids under Abu Hammu Musa II recapture the Kingdom of Tlemcen in Algeria.
- January 25 – In Holland, Floris I van Borselen, keeper of the seal for the former count of Holland, Willem V, reconciles with the new count, Albert of Bavaria.
- January 28 – Shaykh Uways Jalayir, ruler of Iraq, loses control of the city of Tabriz to Akh Juq after the Emir Ali Pilan loses a battle at Nakhchivan (now in the Republic of Azerbaijan)
- February 20 – Hook and Cod wars: The siege of Heusden Castle in Holland ends after a siege of almost six months.
- March 11 – Hook and Cod wars: With the city of Delft in Holland in rebellion, the regent for Holland, Albert of Bavaria, orders the blocking of all waterways around Delft before beginning a formal siege if Delft does not surrender by April 1.
- March 24 –
  - The Second Treaty of London is signed by the monarchs of England (King Edward III) and France (King Jean II, a prisoner of war since 1356 and signing under duress) with a goal of ending the two kingdom's conflict in the Hundred Years' War. Under its terms, which Jean's son the Dauphin Charles refuses to ratify, would have led to the cession of half of France's territory— including Brittany, Normandy, Anjou, Touraine and Maine— to England. King Edward then makes plans to invade France in October.
  - Hook and Cod wars: The siege of Heemskerk Castle, which was started on Dedcember 4 by Albert of Bavaria, administrator of Holland, for the Hook partisans, ends after three months with Heemskerk falling to Albert. During the siege, however, the city of Delft, controlled by the Cod sympathizers, has revolted.

=== April–June ===
- April 1 – Hook and Cod wars: Duke Albert I of Bavaria the Habsburg regent for Holland, begins the siege of Delft, a stronghold for the rebellious Cods. After 10 weeks, Delft surrenders in June under terms of dismantling the city walls and the payment to the Hooks of 40,000 ecus.
- April 19 – A 1357 truce agreed upon by England and France expires after two years, clearing the way for hostilities to resume.
- May 25 – The French States-General repudiates the terms of the Second Treaty of London, signed earlier in the year between England and France.
- May 29 – The siege of Delft ends after two months as the city, a center for the Cods in the Hook and Cod wars, surrenders to the Hooks and the army of the Count of Holland, the regent Albert of Bavaria.
- June 11 – The Battle of Barcelona between the Spanish kingdoms of Castile (with aid from Portugal) and Aragon in the War of the Two Pedros, a naval battle off the coast of Barcelona, ends after two days. Althogh the Castilian Navy of more than 120 ships vastly outnumbers the 10 galleys of Aragon, the Aragonese make the first use of naval artillery and employs its new weapon, a bombard mounted on one of its ships.
- June 20 – Upon the death of Erik Magnusson, his claims to the Swedish throne die with him, and power is restored undivided to his father, King Magnus Eriksson. With this unexpected death of Erik Magnusson, a previous promise to give Helsingborg to Denmark was reneged on by Magnus Eriksson. But Valdemar IV Atterdag was far too ambitious a ruler to have his plan to reassemble the Danish kingdom fall into pieces, and so he proceeded to invade Scania the next year with his mercenary army.

=== July–September ===
- July 4 – Francesco II Ordelaffi surrenders to the Papal commander, Gil de Albornoz.
- August 23 – (28 Ramadan 760 AH) In what is now Spain, Ismail II becomes the new Sultan of Granada in a coup d'état against his half-brother, Muhammed V. About 100 men under Ismail's command scale the walls of the royal palace, the Alhambra, overpower the guards and kill the hajib Ridwan. Muhammad V is away from the palace and flees eastward to the city of Guadix, where his authority is still recognized.
- August – Qulpa becomes Khan of the Blue Horde after the death of Berdi Beg.
- September – Margaret, Countess of Tyrol, and her second husband, Louis V, Duke of Bavaria, are absolved from excommunication.

=== October–December ===
- October 28 – King Edward III of England lands at Calais to begin the Reims campaign, a second invasion of France, after peace negotiations fail, and is determined to reach Reims in order to be crowned as the King of France.
- November 4 – The deposed Granadan sultan Muhammad V flees Europe after conceding defeat and sails to Africa, where he and other former officials end up at Fez in what is now Morocco.
- December 14 – Cangrande II della Scala, Lord of Verona, a city-state in Italy, since 1351, is assassinated on orders of his younger brother, Cansignorio della Scala, who becomes the new ruler.
- December 19 – The General Court of Catalonia (parliament) is held in Cervera, giving birth to the Deputation of the General of Catalonia (Diputació del General de Catalunya), also called Generalitat of Catalonia (Generalitat de Catalunya).

=== Date unknown ===
- Abu Salim Ali II overthrows Muhammad II as-Said as ruler of the Marinid dynasty, in modern-day Morocco.
- Shah Mahmud overthrows his brother, Shah Shuja, as leader of the Muzaffarid tribe in Persia.
- Ananda Patel (considered common ancestor for most of the modern-day population of Bhadran) moves to Bhadran from Anklav.
- Berlin joins the Hanseatic League.
- probable date – Battle of Megara: A Christian coalition defeats a Turkish raider fleet.
- earliest possible date – Bogdan I becomes Prince of Moldavia (modern-day Moldova) after freeing it from Hungarian control. He will be ancestor of the House of Bogdan, who will rule Moldavia for more than three centuries.

== Births ==
1350

- January 23 – Vincent Ferrer, Valencian missionary and saint (d. 1419)
- April 13 – Margaret III, Countess of Flanders (d. 1405)
- June 27 – Manuel II Palaiologos, Byzantine Emperor (d. 1425)
- October 12 – Dmitri Donskoi, Grand Duke of Muscovy and Vladimir (d. 1389)
- November 25 – Katherine Swynford, mistress of John of Gaunt (approximate date; d. 1403)
- December 27 – John I of Aragon (d. 1396)
- date unknown
  - Jehuda Cresques, Catalan cartographer (d. 1427)
  - Agnolo Gaddi, Italian painter (d. 1396)
  - William Gascoigne, Chief Justice of England (approximate date; d. 1419)
  - Thomas Holland, 2nd Earl of Kent (d. 1397)
  - John Montacute, 3rd Earl of Salisbury (approximate date; d. 1400)
  - Madhava of Sangamagrama, Indian mathematician (d. 1425)
  - John I Stanley of the Isle of Man (approximate date; d. 1414)
  - Hrvoje Vukčić Hrvatinić (d. 1415)
  - William le Scrope, 1st Earl of Wiltshire (d. 1399)
  - Andrew of Wyntoun, Scottish historian (d. 1420)
  - Záviš von Zap, Czech theologian and composer (d. c. 1411)

1351

- October 16 – Gian Galeazzo Visconti, first Duke of Milan (d. 1402)
- November 1 – Leopold III, Duke of Austria (d. 1386)
- Princess Joan of France (d. 1371)
- probable – Władysław II Jagiełło, Grand Duke of Lithuania and King of Poland (d. 1434)

1352

- May 5 – Rupert of Germany, Count Palatine of the Rhine (d. 1410)
- Elizabeth of Slavonia, Latin empress consort of Constantinople
- date unknown
  - John Holland, 1st Duke of Exeter (d. 1400)
  - Vytautas the Great, Grand Duke of Lithuania (d. 1430)

1353

- March – Margaret I of Denmark, queen of Haakon VI of Norway (d. 1412)
- July 15 – Vladimir the Bold, Russian prince (d. 1410)
- date unknown
  - Thomas Arundel, Archbishop of Canterbury (d. 1414)
  - Helvis of Brunswick-Grubenhagen, queen consort of Armenia and Cyprus (d. 1421)
  - John Purvey, English scholar and Bible translator (d. 1428)

1354

- Constance of Castile, wife of John of Gaunt (d. 1394)
- Denis, Lord of Cifuentes, infante of Portugal (d. c.1397)
- Alonso Enríquez, Spanish nobleman (d. 1429)
- Frederick III, Count of Moers, German nobleman (d. 1417)
- Gilbert de Greenlaw, Scottish bishop (d. 1421)
- Jean de Grouchy, Norman knight (k. 1435)
- Margaret of Joinville, French noblewoman (d. 1418)
- Thomas de Morley, 4th Baron Morley, English nobleman (d. 1416)
- Eric IV, Duke of Saxe-Lauenburg (d. 1411/12)
- Roger de Scales, 4th Baron Scales, English nobleman (d. 1387)
- Catherine of Vendôme, French noblewoman (d. 1412)
- Violante Visconti, Italian noblewoman (d. 1386)
- Walram IV, Count of Nassau-Idstein, German nobleman (d. 1393)

1355

- January 7 – Thomas of Woodstock, Duke of Gloucester, son of King Edward III of England (d. 1397)
- August 16 – Philippa Plantagenet, Countess of Ulster (d. 1382)
- October 10 – Zhu Biao, eldest son of the Hongwu Emperor and crown prince of the Ming dynasty (d. 1392)
- probable
  - Acamapichtli, 1st tlatoani (monarch) of Tenochtitlan (modern Mexico City), 1375-1395 (d. 1395)
  - Manuel Chrysoloras, Byzantine humanist (d. 1415)
  - Konrad von Jungingen, German 25th Grand Master of the Teutonic Order
  - Gemistus Pletho, Greek scholar
  - Foelke Kampana, Frisian lady and regent (d. 1418)
  - Mircea the Elder, Voivode of Wallachia (d. 1418)

1356

- July 29 – Martin of Aragon (d. 1410)
- date unknown
  - Ingegerd Knutsdotter, Swedish abbess (d. 1412)
  - Robert IV of Artois, Count of Eu (d. 1387)

1357

- April 11 – King John I of Portugal (d. 1433)
- date unknown
  - Art mac Art MacMurrough-Kavanagh, King of Leinster (d. 1417)
  - Hugo von Montfort, Austrian minstrel (d. 1423)
  - Anna of Trebizond, Queen of Georgia (d. 1406)
  - Fang Xiaoru, Confucian scholar (d. 1402)
  - Je Tsongkhapa, founder of the Geluk school of Tibetan Buddhism (d. 1419)

1358

- February 20 – Eleanor of Aragon, queen of John I of Castile (d. 1382)
- August 24 – King John I of Castile (d. 1390)
- September 25 – Ashikaga Yoshimitsu, Japanese shōgun (d. 1408)
- date unknown
  - Ide Pedersdatter Falk, Danish noblewoman (d. 1399)
  - Anne of Auvergne, Sovereign Dauphine of Auvergne and Countess of Forez (d. 1417)

1359

- January 11 – Emperor Go-En'yū of Japan (d. 1393)
- May 19 - Francesco Novello da Carrara, Italian lord (d. 1406)
- July 15 – Antonio Correr, Spanish cardinal (d. 1445)
- date unknown
  - probable – Owain Glyndŵr, last Welsh Prince of Wales (d. 1416)
  - Ashikaga Ujimitsu, Japanese warrior, (d. 1398)
  - Ibn al-Majdi, Egyptian astronomer (d. 1447)
  - Intharacha, Thai king, (d. 1424)
  - James Butler, Irish nobleman (d. 1405)
  - John III of Armagnac, French count (d. 1391)
  - John V, German nobleman (d. 1437)
  - John Dinham, English knight (d 1428)
  - Niccolò da Uzzano, Italian politician, (d. 1431)
  - Sheikh Bedreddin, Ottoman mystic and revolutionary (d. 1420)
  - Wang Zhong, Chinese marquis (d. 1409)

== Deaths ==
1350

- January 6 – Giovanni I di Murta, second doge of the Republic of Genoa
- March 26 or 27 March – Alfonso XI of Castile (b. 1311)
- August 22 – Philip VI of France (b. 1293)
- November 19 – Raoul II of Brienne, Count of Eu
- December 26 – Jean de Marigny, French bishop
- date unknown
  - Maol Íosa V, Earl of Strathearn, last Gaelic Mormaer of Strathearn
  - Olaf of Roskilde, last Danish Bishop of Reval
  - Gayatri Rajapatni, Queen consort of Majapahit
- probable
  - Juan Ruiz, Archpriest of Hita (b. c. 1283)
  - Margaret, Countess of Soissons
  - Namdev, Marathi saint and poet (b. 1270)
- supposed – Till Eulenspiegel, German prankster

1351

- February 13 – Kō no Morofuyu, Japanese general
- March 20 – Muhammad bin Tughluq, Sultan of Delhi
- March 25
  - Kō no Moronao, Japanese samurai
  - Kō no Moroyasu, Japanese samurai
- May 24 – Abu al-Hasan Ali ibn Othman, Sultan of Morocco (b. 1297)
- June 20 – Margareta Ebner, German nun (b. 1291)
- November 15 – Joanna of Pfirt, duchess consort of Austria

1352

- September 15 – Ewostatewos, Ethiopian monk and religious leader (b. 1273)
- December 6 – Pope Clement VI (b. 1291)
- date unknown
  - Matthias of Arras, French architect (b. 1290)
  - Elizabeth of Carinthia, Queen of Sicily, regent of Sicily (b. 1298)
  - William de Ros, 3rd Baron de Ros (b. 1325)
  - Basarab I of Wallachia
  - Al-Hakim II, Caliph of Cairo
  - Laurence Minot, English poet (b. 1300)
  - Vasilii Kalika, Archbishop of Novgorod
  - Yoshida Kenkō, Japanese monk and author (b. 1283)

1353

- February 2 – Anne of Bavaria, queen consort of Bohemia (b. 1329)
- March 6 – Roger Grey, 1st Baron Grey de Ruthyn
- March 11 – Theognostus, metropolitan of Kiev and Moscow
- April 27 – Simeon of Russia, Grand Prince of Moscow and Vladimir
- October 4 – Rudolf II, Duke of Bavaria (b. 1306)
- December 14 – Togha Temür, claimant to the throne of the Mongol Il-Khanate in Persia (assassinated)
- date unknown
  - Matilda, daughter of King Robert the Bruce of Scotland
  - Elisabeth of Austria, Duchess of Lorraine, regent of Lorraine
  - Sir Ulick Burke, Irish nobleman

1354

=== January–March ===
- January 8 – Charles de La Cerda (b. 1327)
- January 16 – Joanna of Châtillon, Duchess of Athens (b. c. 1285)

=== April–June ===
- June 1 – Kitabatake Chikafusa, Japanese court noble (b. 1293)

=== July–September ===
- August 9 – Stephen, Duke of Slavonia, Hungarian prince (b. 1332)
- September 7 – Andrea Dandolo, doge of Venice (b. 1306)

=== October–December ===
- October 5 – Giovanni Visconti, Italian Roman Catholic cardinal (b. 1290)
- October 8 – Cola di Rienzo, Roman tribune (b. c. 1313)
- October 19 – Yusuf I, Sultan of Granada (b. 1318)
- date unknown – Wu Zhen, Chinese painter (b. 1280)

1355

- January 7 – Inês de Castro, lover of King Peter I of Portugal (murdered) (b. 1325)
- April 17 – Marin Falier, Doge of Venice (b. 1285)
- April 22 – Eleanor of Woodstock, countess regent of Guelders, eldest daughter of King Edward II of England (b. 1318)
- May – Guo Zixing, Chinese Red Turban rebel leader
- August 3 – Bartholomew de Burghersh, 1st Baron Burghersh
- October 16 – Louis of Sicily
- December 5 – John III, Duke of Brabant (b. 1300)
- December 20 – Stefan Dušan, Emperor of Serbia
- date unknown – Bettina d'Andrea, Italian lawyer and professor

1356

- January 10 – Toqto'a, Yuan dynasty official who was murdered (b. 1314)
- June 23 – Margaret II, Countess of Hainaut (b. 1311)
- September 19 (killed at the Battle of Poitiers):
  - Peter I, Duke of Bourbon (b. 1311)
  - Walter VI, Count of Brienne, Constable of France (b. 1304)
- date unknown
  - Harihara I, founder of the Vijayanagara Empire
  - Zheng Yunduan, Chinese poet (b. c. 1327)

1357

- January 18 – Maria of Portugal, infanta (b. 1313)
- May 28 – King Afonso IV of Portugal (b. 1291)
- July 13 – Bartolus de Saxoferrato, Italian jurist (b. 1313)
- date unknown
  - Usman Serajuddin, court scholar of the Bengal Sultanate (b. 1258)
  - Ziauddin Barani, historian and political thinker of the Delhi Sultanate (b. 1285)
  - Jani Beg, Khan of the Blue Horde
  - Kazerouni, Masoud, Persian physician
  - Rao Tida, Rathore ruler of Marwar

1358

- January 6 – Gertrude van der Oosten, Dutch beguine
- January 10 – Abu Inan Faris, Marinid ruler of Morocco (b. 1329)
- February 11 – Ala-ud-Din Bahman Shah, first Bahmani Sultan of Deccan
- June 7 – Ashikaga Takauji, Japanese shōgun (b. 1305)
- c. June – Guillaume Cale, French peasant revolutionary (executed)
- July 31 – Étienne Marcel, Provost of the merchants of Paris
- August 16 – Albert II, Duke of Austria (b. 1298)
- August 22 – Isabella of France, queen consort of Edward II of England (b. 1295)
- November – Gregory of Rimini, Italian philosopher
- December 29 – Niels Bugge, Danish magnate and rebel leader (murdered) (b. 1300)
- date unknown – Brian MacCathmhaoil, Irish Bishop of Clogher (plague)

1359

- June 21 – Erik Magnusson, king of Sweden since 1356 (b. 1339)
- October 10 – King Hugh IV of Cyprus (b. 1310)
- October 25 – Beatrice of Castile, queen consort of Portugal (b. 1293)
- November 13 – Ivan II of Russia, Grand Duke of Moscovy (b. 1326)
- December 14 – Cangrande II della Scala, Lord of Verona (b. 1332)
- date unknown – Jeanne de Clisson, French noblewoman and privateer (b. 1300)
