= 1356 =

1356 in various calendars
- Gregorian calendar: 1356; MCCCLVI
- Ab urbe condita: 2109
- Armenian calendar: 805; ԹՎ ՊԵ
- Assyrian calendar: 6106
- Balinese saka calendar: 1277–1278
- Bengali calendar: 762–763
- Berber calendar: 2306
- English Regnal year: 29 Edw. 3 – 30 Edw. 3
- Buddhist calendar: 1900
- Burmese calendar: 718
- Byzantine calendar: 6864–6865
- Chinese calendar: 乙未年 (Wood Goat); 4053 or 3846 — to — 丙申年 (Fire Monkey); 4054 or 3847
- Coptic calendar: 1072–1073
- Discordian calendar: 2522
- Ethiopian calendar: 1348–1349
- Hebrew calendar: 5116–5117
- Hindu calendars
- Vikram Samvat: 1412–1413
- Shaka Samvat: 1277–1278
- Kali Yuga: 4456–4457
- Holocene calendar: 11356
- Igbo calendar: 356–357
- Iranian calendar: 734–735
- Islamic calendar: 756–758
- Japanese calendar: Bunna 5 / Enbun 1 (延文元年)
- Javanese calendar: 1268–1269
- Julian calendar: 1356; MCCCLVI
- Korean calendar: 3689
- Minguo calendar: 556 before ROC 民前556年
- Nanakshahi calendar: −112
- Thai solar calendar: 1898–1899
- Tibetan calendar: ཤིང་མོ་ལུག་ལོ་ (female Wood-Sheep); 1482 or 1101 or 329 — to — མེ་ཕོ་སྤྲེ་ལོ་ (male Fire-Monkey); 1483 or 1102 or 330

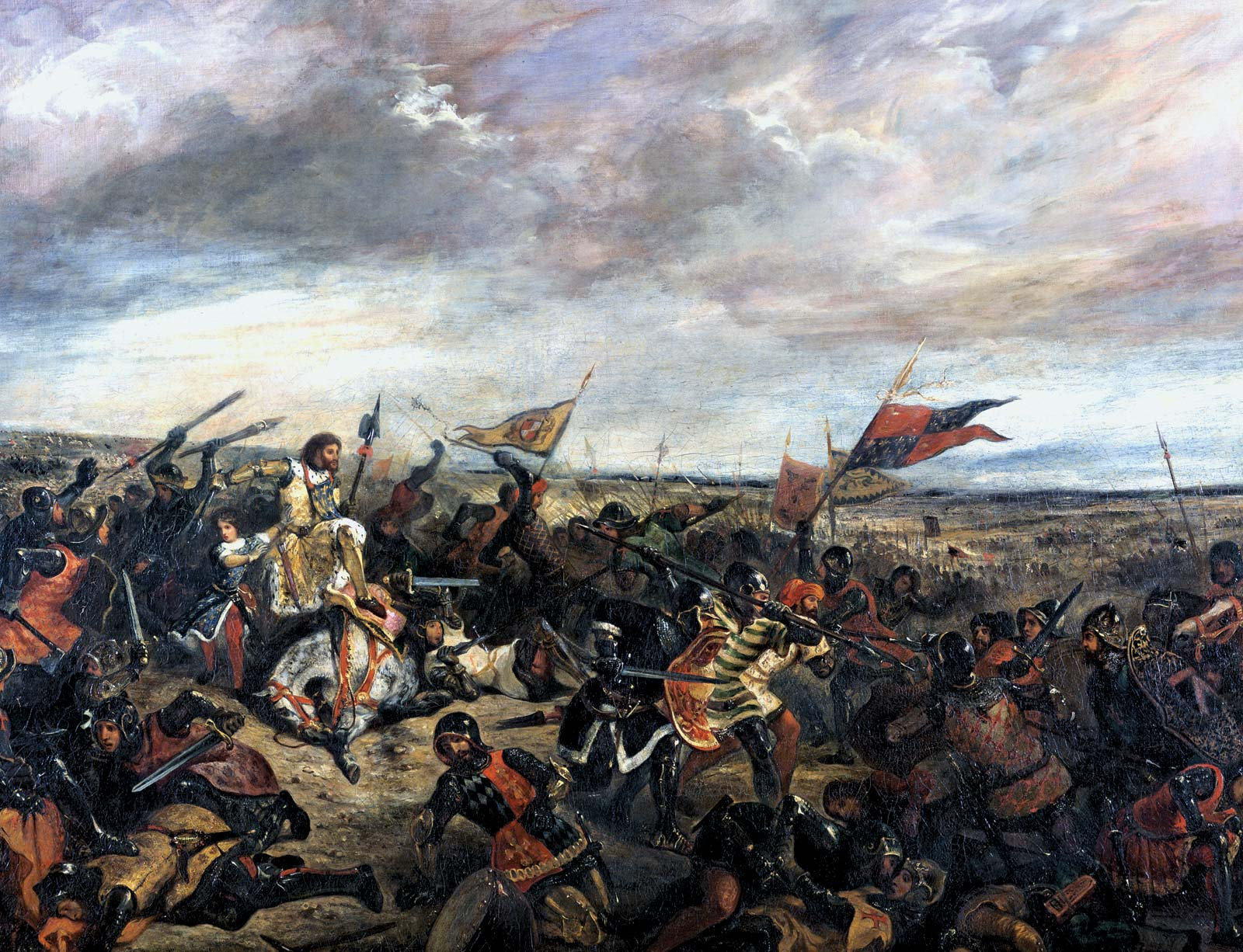
September 19: Edward the Black Prince leads the English to victory over the French at the Battle of Poitiers and takes King Jean II of France as a prisoner of war.

Year 1356 (MCCCLVI) was a leap year starting on Friday of the Julian calendar.

== Events ==
=== January–March ===
- January 10 – The first 23 articles of the Golden Bull of 1356 are issued at Nuremberg by the Imperial Diet of the Holy Roman Empire as a constitution of the Empire.
- January 20 – Edward Balliol surrenders his title as King of Scotland, to Edward III of England.
- January 26 – Burnt Candlemas: King Edward III of England begins an invasion of the Kingdom of Scotland by land and by sea, seven days before the February 2 celebration of "Candlemas" and his army of 13,000 men marches into the Lothian region, with plans to take the Scottish capital, Edinburgh. The Scots begin a scorched earth policy, evacuating the towns in the path of King Edward's troops and destroying territory to keep the invaders from having access to food. The English troops arrive in Edinburgh in early February and begin burning the city. In the middle of February, a winter gale scatters the English Royal Navy, sinks several ships, and prevents the English from being resupplied.
- February 2 – The Hanseatic League, a trading alliance between many cities in northern Europe, first meets, convening at Lübeck with representatives from cities in Saxony (led by Lübeck), from Westphalia and the Rhein (led by Dortmund), and from Sweden and Lithuania (led by Visby)
- February 25 – To celebrate the conclusion of the meeting of the representatives of the Hanseatic League, the Matthiae-Mahl feast is celebrated the first time, and will continue to be observed more than 650 years later as the world's oldest ceremonial meal.
- March 10 – English troops in France capture the city of Bétaille.
- March 12 – Rudolf II of Saxe-Wittenberg becomes the new Elector of Saxony, one of the member nations of the Holy Roman Empire upon the death of his father, the Elector Rudolf I, who had ruled for 57 years.
- March 17 – The Yuan Chinese city of Zhenjiang falls to General Xu Da, an ally of Zhu Yuanzhang in the Red Turban Rebellion.

=== April–June ===
- April 5 – In the city of Rouen in France, where the major nobles of Normandy are refusing to pay further taxes for the French war effort, King Jean II arrives with supporters at a banquet where the nobles are dining at the invitation of the Dauphin Charles, King Jean's oldest son. After listening to the complaints of the nobles, King Jean orders 10 of the most outspoken of them to be arrested, including King Carlos II of Navarre. Four of the leaders are quickly beheaded, while King Carlos is imprisoned in Paris.
- April 10 – Zhu Yuanzhang, a leader of the Red Turban Rebellion, captures the city of Nanjing from the Mongol-led Yuan dynasty in China, and renames it Yingtian. From then on, Nanjingbecomes his base of power, and the capital of the Ming dynasty which he will establish in 1368 as the Hongwu Emperor.
- April 18 – A truce is agreed upon between England and Scotland after King Edward's troops have retreated back across the border to the English town of Carlisle.
- May 9 – Gautier of Brienne, the self-styled Duke of Athens and former ruler of the Republic of Florence, is appointed Constable of France by King Jean II. As part of his duties as the foremost of the Great Officers of the Crown of France and commander of the French Army. Brienne holds the office for four months before being killed on September 15 at the Battle of Poitiers.
- May 14 – Responding to the invasion of France by the Kingdom of England and the Kingdom of Navarre, King Jean II announces an arrière-ban, a call-to-arms for all able-bodied French men and boys to join the French Army. The appeal is generally ignored by the citizens, as are similar calls-to-arms later in the month and again in early June.
- June 13 – (13 Jumada al-Akhir 757 AH) Ajlan ibn Rumaythah is temporarily deposed as Emir of the Sharifate of Mecca (now in Saudi Arabia) by his brother Thaqabah ibn Rumaythah. When the Hajj, the pilgrimage of Muslims to the holy city of Mecca, begins in November, Ajilan returns and Thaqabah is forced to flee to Yemen.
- June 17 – The city of Lwów is granted Magdeburg rights by Casimir III the Great, King of Poland. The advantages of the rights are not only economic, but also political.

=== July–September ===
- July 5 – The siege of Breteuil, started by French forces against Navarrese occupiers of the city in April, is interrupted by the chevauchée of Normandy, led by the English commander Henry of Lancaster. During his interruption of France's siege, Lancaster resupplies the city of Breteuil. The city surrenders on August 20.
- August 20 – Edward, the Black Prince, eldest son of King Edward III of England and heir to the throne, begins the siege of Romorantin and forces the surrender of the town after six days.
- August 29 – Edward, the Black Prince, eldest son of King Edward III of England and heir to the throne, begins the siege of Romorantin and forces the surrender of the town after six days.
- September 19 – Hundred Years' War – Battle of Poitiers: The English, commanded by Edward the Black Prince, defeat the French. The greatly outnumbered English forces not only rout the French, but capture the French king John II of France and his youngest son, the future Philip the Bold of Burgundy.

=== October–December ===
- October 17 – Erik XII proclaims himself king of Sweden, in opposition to his father, King Magnus IV. Thus begins a civil war in Sweden between father and son, which will last until Erik's death in 1359.
- October 18 (St Luke's Day) – The Basel earthquake affects northern Switzerland, with a maximum MSK intensity of IX–X (Destructive–Devastating), leaving around 1,000 dead. It is the most damaging intraplate earthquake known to have occurred in central Europe.
- November 15 – Simone Boccanegra takes office as the Doge of the Republic of Genoa, an office that had been vacant since the republic had come under the control of the Visconti family of the Lordship of Milan in 1353.
- November 17 – In the Holy Roman Empire, the Diet of Metz, the imperial parliament with representatives from all the member electorates, principalities and duchies of the federation, is opened by Charles IV, Holy Roman Emperor. The session lasts for more than seven weeks session at Metz, at the time the capital of the semi-independent Republic of Metz and now part of France, and lasts. until January 7.
- December 25 – Charles IV, Holy Roman Emperor, promulgates the Golden Bull and the last eight of 31 articles as a constitution for his empire.

=== Date unknown ===
- Sweden's first guild privileges (for tailors) are issued in Stockholm.
- Ghazan II replaces Anushirwan as ruler of the Ilkhanate in Persia.
- The majority of the Great Pyramid of Giza's limestone casing stones are removed by Bahri Sultan An-Nasir Hasan, to build fortresses and mosques in the nearby city of Cairo, leaving the first of the Seven Wonders of the Ancient World in the step-stone condition in which it remains into modern times.
- The Castelvecchio Bridge in Verona is probably completed this year; its main span of 48.7 m (160 ft) is the world's longest arch at this time.

== Births ==
- July 29 – Martin of Aragon (d. 1410)
- date unknown
  - Ingegerd Knutsdotter, Swedish abbess (d. 1412)
  - Robert IV of Artois, Count of Eu (d. 1387)

== Deaths ==
- January 10 – Toqto'a, Yuan dynasty official who was murdered (b. 1314)
- June 23 – Margaret II, Countess of Hainaut (b. 1311)
- September 19 (killed at the Battle of Poitiers):
  - Peter I, Duke of Bourbon (b. 1311)
  - Walter VI, Count of Brienne, Constable of France (b. 1304)
- date unknown
  - Harihara I, founder of the Vijayanagara Empire
  - Zheng Yunduan, Chinese poet (b. c. 1327)
