= Treaty of Stralsund =

Treaty of Stralsund may refer to:

- Treaty of Stralsund (1354)
- Treaty of Stralsund (1370)
