= 1359 =

1359 in various calendars
- Gregorian calendar: 1359; MCCCLIX
- Ab urbe condita: 2112
- Armenian calendar: 808; ԹՎ ՊԸ
- Assyrian calendar: 6109
- Balinese saka calendar: 1280–1281
- Bengali calendar: 765–766
- Berber calendar: 2309
- English Regnal year: 32 Edw. 3 – 33 Edw. 3
- Buddhist calendar: 1903
- Burmese calendar: 721
- Byzantine calendar: 6867–6868
- Chinese calendar: 戊戌年 (Earth Dog); 4056 or 3849 — to — 己亥年 (Earth Pig); 4057 or 3850
- Coptic calendar: 1075–1076
- Discordian calendar: 2525
- Ethiopian calendar: 1351–1352
- Hebrew calendar: 5119–5120
- Hindu calendars
- Vikram Samvat: 1415–1416
- Shaka Samvat: 1280–1281
- Kali Yuga: 4459–4460
- Holocene calendar: 11359
- Igbo calendar: 359–360
- Iranian calendar: 737–738
- Islamic calendar: 760–761
- Japanese calendar: Enbun 4 (延文４年)
- Javanese calendar: 1271–1272
- Julian calendar: 1359; MCCCLIX
- Korean calendar: 3692
- Minguo calendar: 553 before ROC 民前553年
- Nanakshahi calendar: −109
- Thai solar calendar: 1901–1902
- Tibetan calendar: ས་ཕོ་ཁྱི་ལོ་ (male Earth-Dog); 1485 or 1104 or 332 — to — ས་མོ་ཕག་ལོ་ (female Earth-Boar); 1486 or 1105 or 333

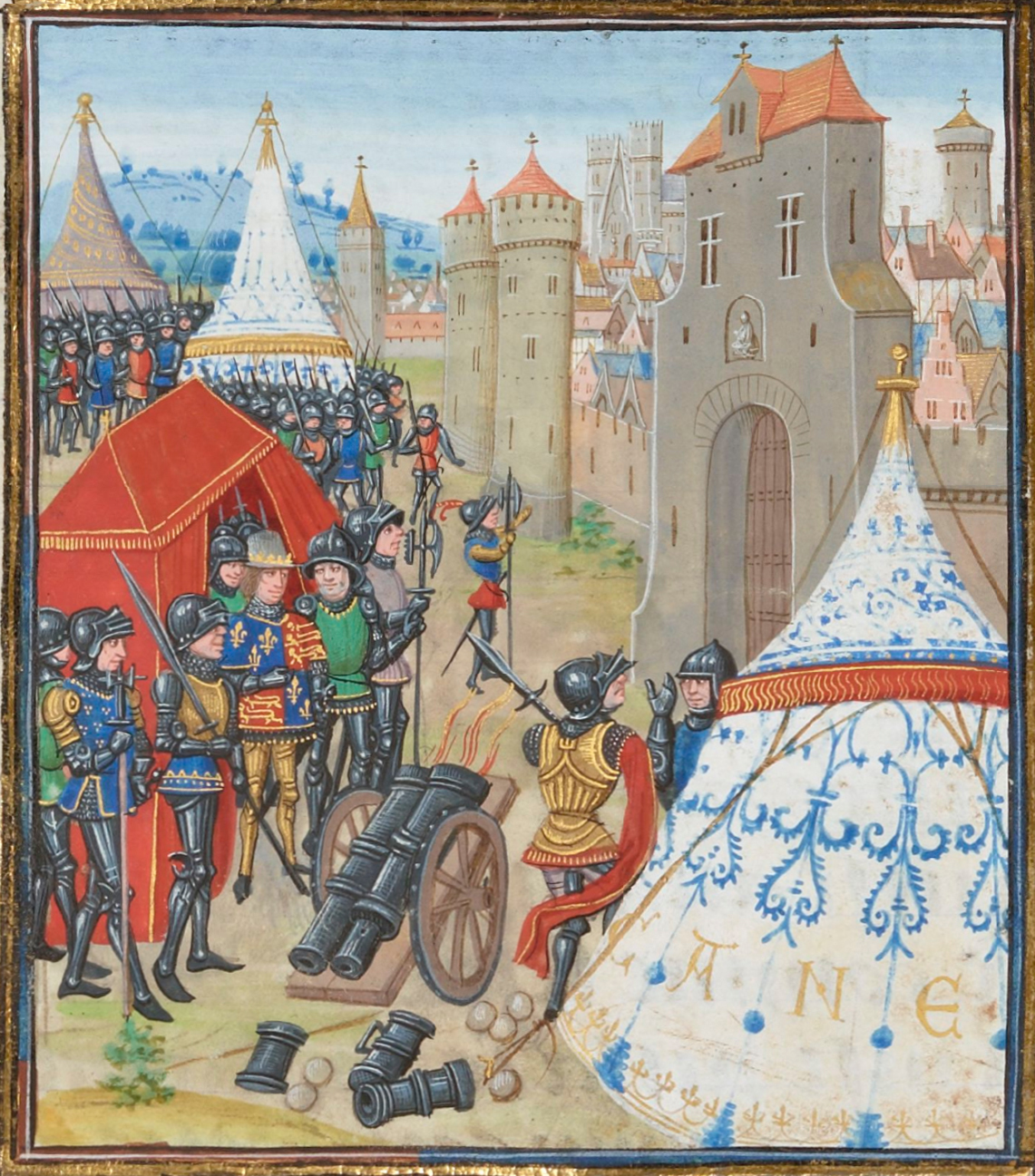
October 28: King Edward III of England leads an invasion of the Kingdom of France, with a goal of capturing the French throne.

Year 1359 (MCCCLIX) was a common year starting on Tuesday of the Julian calendar.

== Events ==
=== January–March ===
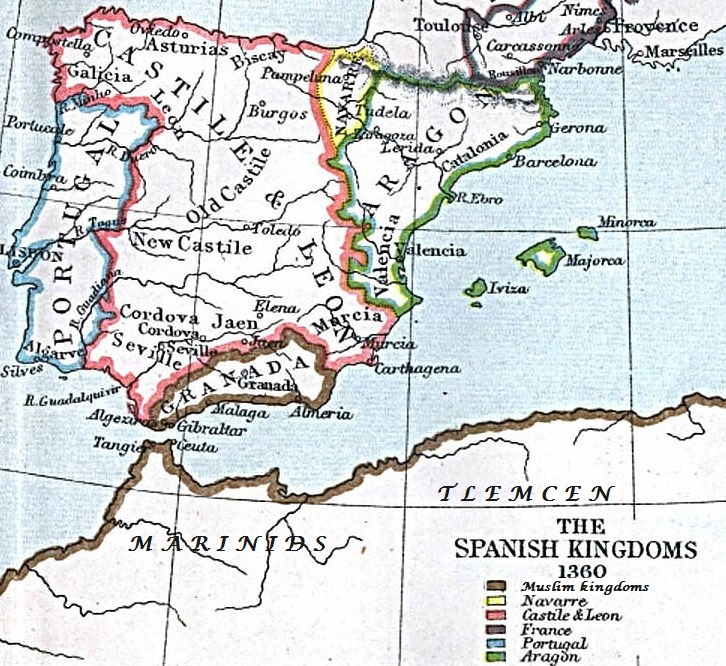
The various kingdoms in Iberia and Spain in 1359

- January 9 – The Zayanids under Abu Hammu Musa II recapture the Kingdom of Tlemcen in Algeria.
- January 25 – In Holland, Floris I van Borselen, keeper of the seal for the former count of Holland, Willem V, reconciles with the new count, Albert of Bavaria.
- January 28 – Shaykh Uways Jalayir, ruler of Iraq, loses control of the city of Tabriz to Akh Juq after the Emir Ali Pilan loses a battle at Nakhchivan (now in the Republic of Azerbaijan)
- February 20 – Hook and Cod wars: The siege of Heusden Castle in Holland ends after a siege of almost six months.
- March 11 – Hook and Cod wars: With the city of Delft in Holland in rebellion, the regent for Holland, Albert of Bavaria, orders the blocking of all waterways around Delft before beginning a formal siege if Delft does not surrender by April 1.
- March 24 –
  - The Second Treaty of London is signed by the monarchs of England (King Edward III) and France (King Jean II, a prisoner of war since 1356 and signing under duress) with a goal of ending the two kingdom's conflict in the Hundred Years' War. Under its terms, which Jean's son the Dauphin Charles refuses to ratify, would have led to the cession of half of France's territory— including Brittany, Normandy, Anjou, Touraine and Maine— to England. King Edward then makes plans to invade France in October.
  - Hook and Cod wars: The siege of Heemskerk Castle, which was started on Dedcember 4 by Albert of Bavaria, administrator of Holland, for the Hook partisans, ends after three months with Heemskerk falling to Albert. During the siege, however, the city of Delft, controlled by the Cod sympathizers, has revolted.

=== April–June ===
- April 1 – Hook and Cod wars: Duke Albert I of Bavaria the Habsburg regent for Holland, begins the siege of Delft, a stronghold for the rebellious Cods. After 10 weeks, Delft surrenders in June under terms of dismantling the city walls and the payment to the Hooks of 40,000 ecus.
- April 19 – A 1357 truce agreed upon by England and France expires after two years, clearing the way for hostilities to resume.
- May 25 – The French States-General repudiates the terms of the Second Treaty of London, signed earlier in the year between England and France.
- May 29 – The siege of Delft ends after two months as the city, a center for the Cods in the Hook and Cod wars, surrenders to the Hooks and the army of the Count of Holland, the regent Albert of Bavaria.
- June 11 – The Battle of Barcelona between the Spanish kingdoms of Castile (with aid from Portugal) and Aragon in the War of the Two Pedros, a naval battle off the coast of Barcelona, ends after two days. Althogh the Castilian Navy of more than 120 ships vastly outnumbers the 10 galleys of Aragon, the Aragonese make the first use of naval artillery and employs its new weapon, a bombard mounted on one of its ships.
- June 20 – Upon the death of Erik Magnusson, his claims to the Swedish throne die with him, and power is restored undivided to his father, King Magnus Eriksson. With this unexpected death of Erik Magnusson, a previous promise to give Helsingborg to Denmark was reneged on by Magnus Eriksson. But Valdemar IV Atterdag was far too ambitious a ruler to have his plan to reassemble the Danish kingdom fall into pieces, and so he proceeded to invade Scania the next year with his mercenary army.

=== July–September ===
- July 4 – Francesco II Ordelaffi surrenders to the Papal commander, Gil de Albornoz.
- August 23 – (28 Ramadan 760 AH) In what is now Spain, Ismail II becomes the new Sultan of Granada in a coup d'état against his half-brother, Muhammed V. About 100 men under Ismail's command scale the walls of the royal palace, the Alhambra, overpower the guards and kill the hajib Ridwan. Muhammad V is away from the palace and flees eastward to the city of Guadix, where his authority is still recognized.
- August – Qulpa becomes Khan of the Blue Horde after the death of Berdi Beg.
- September – Margaret, Countess of Tyrol, and her second husband, Louis V, Duke of Bavaria, are absolved from excommunication.

=== October–December ===
- October 28 – King Edward III of England lands at Calais to begin the Reims campaign, a second invasion of France, after peace negotiations fail, and is determined to reach Reims in order to be crowned as the King of France.
- November 4 – The deposed Granadan sultan Muhammad V flees Europe after conceding defeat and sails to Africa, where he and other former officials end up at Fez in what is now Morocco.
- December 14 – Cangrande II della Scala, Lord of Verona, a city-state in Italy, since 1351, is assassinated on orders of his younger brother, Cansignorio della Scala, who becomes the new ruler.
- December 19 – The General Court of Catalonia (parliament) is held in Cervera, giving birth to the Deputation of the General of Catalonia (Diputació del General de Catalunya), also called Generalitat of Catalonia (Generalitat de Catalunya).

=== Date unknown ===
- Abu Salim Ali II overthrows Muhammad II as-Said as ruler of the Marinid dynasty, in modern-day Morocco.
- Shah Mahmud overthrows his brother, Shah Shuja, as leader of the Muzaffarid tribe in Persia.
- Ananda Patel (considered common ancestor for most of the modern-day population of Bhadran) moves to Bhadran from Anklav.
- Berlin joins the Hanseatic League.
- probable date – Battle of Megara: A Christian coalition defeats a Turkish raider fleet.
- earliest possible date – Bogdan I becomes Prince of Moldavia (modern-day Moldova) after freeing it from Hungarian control. He will be ancestor of the House of Bogdan, who will rule Moldavia for more than three centuries.

== Births ==
- January 11 – Emperor Go-En'yū of Japan (d. 1393)
- May 19 - Francesco Novello da Carrara, Italian lord (d. 1406)
- July 15 – Antonio Correr, Spanish cardinal (d. 1445)
- date unknown
  - probable – Owain Glyndŵr, last Welsh Prince of Wales (d. 1416)
  - Ashikaga Ujimitsu, Japanese warrior, (d. 1398)
  - Ibn al-Majdi, Egyptian astronomer (d. 1447)
  - Intharacha, Thai king, (d. 1424)
  - James Butler, Irish nobleman (d. 1405)
  - John III of Armagnac, French count (d. 1391)
  - John V, German nobleman (d. 1437)
  - John Dinham, English knight (d 1428)
  - Niccolò da Uzzano, Italian politician, (d. 1431)
  - Sheikh Bedreddin, Ottoman mystic and revolutionary (d. 1420)
  - Wang Zhong, Chinese marquis (d. 1409)

== Deaths ==
- June 21 – Erik Magnusson, king of Sweden since 1356 (b. 1339)
- October 10 – King Hugh IV of Cyprus (b. 1310)
- October 25 – Beatrice of Castile, queen consort of Portugal (b. 1293)
- November 13 – Ivan II of Russia, Grand Duke of Moscovy (b. 1326)
- December 14 – Cangrande II della Scala, Lord of Verona (b. 1332)
- date unknown – Jeanne de Clisson, French noblewoman and privateer (b. 1300)
