= 1311 =

1311 in various calendars
Gregorian calendar	1311; MCCCXI
Ab urbe condita	2064
Armenian calendar	760; ԹՎ ՉԿ
Assyrian calendar	6061
Balinese saka calendar	1232–1233
Bengali calendar	717–718
Berber calendar	2261
English Regnal year	4 Edw. 2 – 5 Edw. 2
Buddhist calendar	1855
Burmese calendar	673
Byzantine calendar	6819–6820
Chinese calendar	庚戌年 (Metal Dog); 4008 or 3801 — to — 辛亥年 (Metal Pig); 4009 or 3802
Coptic calendar	1027–1028
Discordian calendar	2477
Ethiopian calendar	1303–1304
Hebrew calendar	5071–5072
- Hindu calendars
Vikram Samvat	1367–1368
Shaka Samvat	1232–1233
Kali Yuga	4411–4412
Holocene calendar	11311
Igbo calendar	311–312
Iranian calendar	689–690
Islamic calendar	710–711
Japanese calendar	Enkyō 4 / Ōchō 1 (応長元年)
Javanese calendar	1222–1223
Julian calendar	1311; MCCCXI
Korean calendar	3644
Minguo calendar	601 before ROC 民前601年
Nanakshahi calendar	−157
Thai solar calendar	1853–1854
Tibetan calendar	ལྕགས་ཕོ་ཁྱི་ལོ་ (male Iron-Dog); 1437 or 1056 or 284 — to — ལྕགས་མོ་ཕག་ལོ་ (female Iron-Boar); 1438 or 1057 or 285

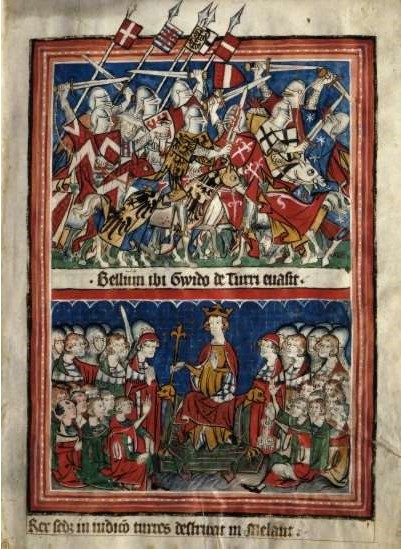
A depiction of the Milan Uprising

Year 1311 (MCCCXI) was a common year starting on Friday of the Julian calendar.

== Events ==
=== January – March ===
- January 6 – Henry VII, the future Holy Roman Emperor, is crowned King of Italy in Milan with a mock-up of the Iron crown of Lombardy. The Tuscan Guelphs refuse to attend the ceremony and begin preparing for resistance against Henry's rule. Henry approves the despotic regimes of Matteo I Visconti in Milan and Cangrande I della Scala in Verona. The cities of Piedmont and Lombardy submit to Henry – in accordance with the proclaimed program of peace and justice. Florence and their Guelph (anti-imperialist) allies in Tuscany and Romagna move to defend themselves against Henry's accession.
- February 12 – Milan Uprising: German forces under Baldwin of Luxembourg (brother of Henry VII) crush the Italian Guelph troops, led by Guido della Torre in Milan. A contingent of Teutonic Knights kills and disperses most of the rebels in a single cavalry charge. Guido della Torre escapes, and is condemned to death in absence by Henry.
- March 15 – The Battle of Halmyros is fought in Greece as the mercenaries of the Catalan Company defeat the Latin forces (some 15,000 men), and their allies under Walter V at Halmyros (southern Thessaly). After the battle, they take control of the Duchy of Athens. Later, Catalan forces peacefully occupy all of Attica and Boeotia, which they rule as part of Greece (until the 1380s).
- March 20 – King Ferdinand IV, known as "Ferdinand the Summoned", grants new privileges to the Catholic Church within the Kingdom of Castile during an assembly at Palencia. In April, Ferdinand becomes seriously ill and is transferred to Valladolid, despite the opposition of his wife, Queen Constance, who wishes to transfer him to Carrión de los Condes (northern Spain).

=== April – June ===
- April 7
  - In Asia, Ayurbarwada Buyantu Khan is proclaimed as the Mongol Emperor Renzong of Yuan Dynasty China, 10 weeks after the death of his brother, Külüg Khan.
  - Battle of Woplauken: In Europe, the Teutonic Knights defeat the Grand Duchy of Lithuania.
- April 26 – King Henry VII of Italy razes the city walls of Cremona after suppressing the rebellion of the Torriani family against his rule.
- April 27 – Pope Clement V, having decided to let the Council of Vienne determine the question of whether the late Pope Boniface VIII had been guilty of heresy, officially excuses King Philip IV of France from any condemnation of Boniface.
- May 29 – Sancho the Peaceful of Barcelona becomes the new King of Majorca, a set of islands in the Mediterranean Sea (now Spain's Balearic Islands) after the death of his father, King Jaume II
- June 9 – The painting Maestà the master work of the Italian artist Duccio di Buoninsegna, is unveiled at the Siena Cathedral in the Republic of Siena.
- June 11 – Boleslaw III the Wasteful, Duke of Wroclaw, renounces his claims to the throne of the Kingdom of Poland
- June 25 – Matthew III Csák, the Palatine of Hungary, attempts to expand his territory within the kingdom and pillages the area around the town of Buda (now half of the city of Budapest.

=== July – September ===
- July 6
  - Bolad, who had served as the Mongol Empire's representative in the Middle East as Ikhanate, is appointed as the Duke of Ze by the Mongol Emperor of Yuan dynasty China, Ayurbarwada Buyantu Khan
  - Eleven days after beginning his siege of Buda, Matthew III Csak is excommunicated by Gentile Portino da Montefiore, the Roman Catholic Cardinal sent by Pope Clement V.
- July 13 – Matteo I Visconti is restored to rule over the Duchy of Milan after purchasing the title of imperial vicar from the new King of Italy, Henry VII.
- July 25 – At Algeciras a fleet of Marinid ships, arrives after being sent by Morocco's Sultan Abu Sa'id Uthman II, who was attempting to restore the Muslim presence.
- August 13 – Pietro Gradenigo, Doge of the Republic of Venice since 1289, dies after a reign of 22 years. Marino Zorzi is elected by the Venetian nobles to replace Gradenigo as the republic's chief executive officer.
- August 16 – The Parliament of England presents the Ordinances of 1311 to King Edward II (document dated 5 October; published on 11 October); these substitute the 21 Lord Ordainers for the King as the effective government of the country.
- September 5 – In the northeastern part of the Kingdom of Hungary, in what is now the Republic of Slovakia, the oligarch Amadeus Aba is assassinated by rebels at the south gate of Košice.
- September 16 – After a four-month siege, Guelph rebels in the Italian city of Brescia surrender to Cangrande I della Scala, Lord of Verona and officer of King Henry VII.

=== October – December ===
- October 3 – Peace is restored in northeastern Hungary as the envoys of King Charles I arbitrate and agreement between the rebels at Košice and the two sons of the late Amadeus Aba, Amadeus II and Dominic.
- October 11 – The Ordinances of 1311 are published in England by King Edward II, restricting the power of the monarchs of England.
- October 16 – Council of Vienne: Pope Clement V convokes the 15th Ecumenical Council at Vienne, France, in the presence of 20 cardinals, about 100 archbishops and bishops, and a number of abbots and priors. The main item on the agenda of the council is the Order of the Knights Templar. Clement passes papal bulls to dissolve the Templar Order, confiscate their lands, and label them as heretics.
- October 28 – King Ferdinand IV of Castile signs the Concord of Palencia with the principal magnates of the rest of the kingdom (including his brother, Prince John of Castile), promising to respect the customs and privileges of the subjects of his towns, and as well as to not deprive the nobles of the rents and lands that belong to the Crown.
- November 5 – Eight days after the signing of the Concord of Palencia, John of Castile violates his promise to his nephew Ferdinand IV and enters into an alliance with Juan Núñez II de Lara.
- November 13 – (1 Ocho, 22nd day of 9th month) Munenobu Hojo becomes the regent for the Kamakura Shogunate (to July 1312).
- November 23 – Pope Clement V appoints Jens Grand, the Danish-born Prince-Archbishopric of Bremen, as the arbiter of a dispute between the Archbishopric of Riga (at the time of Terra Mariana, now the Republic of Latvia) and Teutonic Prussia (now part of Poland).
- November 29 – Alboino I della Scala, the Lord of Verona, dies and is succeeded by his brother Cangrande.
- December 26 – Al-Mahdi Muhammad bin al-Mutahhar, the Shi'ite Muslim Imam of the Zaidiyyah state in Yemen, leads Zaidi troops to victory in a battle in the Sheref district against the Sunni Muslim Rasulid sultanate that dominates most of Yemen. A 10-year ceasefire agreement is brokered between Zaidiyyah and the Rasulid Sultan al-Mu'ayyad Da'udsultan.

== By place ==
=== England ===
- Bolingbroke Castle passes to the House of Lancaster.
- Lincoln Cathedral in England is completed; with the spire reaching around 525 feet (160 m), it becomes the world's tallest structure (surpassing the Great Pyramid of Giza, which held the record for almost 4,000 years), a record it holds until the spire is blown down in 1549.

== Births ==
- March 29 – Amadeus III, Savoyan nobleman and knight (d. 1367)
- April 3 – Margaret de Bohun, English noblewoman (d. 1391)
- July 1 – Liu Bowen, Chinese statesman and politician (d. 1375)
- August 13 – Alfonso XI, nicknamed "Alfonso the Avenger", King of Castile (d. 1350)
- unknown dates
  - Margaret I, German queen and Holy Roman Empress (d. 1356)
  - Munenaga, Japanese nobleman, prince and priest (d. 1385)
  - Peter I, Duke of Bourbon, French nobleman, knight and ambassador (d. 1356)

== Deaths ==
- January 27 – Külüg Khan, Mongol ruler and Emperor Wuzong of the Yuan dynasty China, (b. 1281)
- March 3 (date buried) – Antony Bek, English bishop and patriarch (b. 1245)
- March 15
  - Walter V, French nobleman (House of Brienne) (b. 1275)
  - Thomas III d'Autremencourt, Lord of Salona, Marshal of Achaea
  - George I Ghisi, Triarch of Euboea, Baron of Chalandritsa, Lord of Tinos, Mykonos, Serifos and Keos
- April – Botulf Botulfsson, Swedish peasant executed for heresy (only confirmed case of an execution for heresy by the Catholic church in Sweden)
- May 29 – James II of Majorca (b. 1243)
- August 13 – Pietro Gradenigo, Doge of Venice
- September 5 – Amadeus Aba, Hungarian oligarch
- December 14 – Margaret of Brabant, German queen consort (b. 1276)
- date unknown
  - David VIII of Georgia (b. 1273)
  - Arnold of Villanova, Spanish alchemist and physician (b. 1235)
  - Mangrai, founding king of Lan Na (b. 1238)
- probable – Bernard Saisset, Occitan bishop of Pamiers (b. 1232)
