= Zheng Yunduan =

Chinese poet

Zheng Yunduan (c. 1327 – 1356) was a Chinese poet in the Yuan Dynasty, whose stylename was Zhengshu.

Her family came from Suzhu and was known for its scholars. Zheng Yunduan's father and brothers were all teachers, and her father taught her to read; as she grew older, she gained more education by reading texts discarded by her father.

She married a man named Shi Boren, who shared her interests in scholarship and art. During her lifetime she wrote many poems, and published a collection entitled Suyong Ji ('Reverential Harmony'). In the collection, she described her desire to write poems that stepped outside of what she saw as the traditional subjects for female poets (such as nature). Much of her poetry featured discussion of paintings, culture, morality, philosophy, and her own mortality. Additionally, she wrote of the realities of life as a woman, such as being unfairly unable to travel to see the famous landscapes portrayed in the paintings she admired.

Zheng Yunduan died at age 30, after a long-lasting illness which was possibly exacerbated by her home being ransacked and burnt by troops during fighting surrounding the rebellion of Zhang Shicheng.
