= Battle of Megara (1359) =

Battle between Christian states in southern Greece and Turkish forces

- Part of the Crusades
Date	1359
Location	Megara Gulf 37°57′N 23°20′E
Result	Christian victory

Belligerents
Republic of Venice (Sovereign Military Order of Malta) Knights Hospitaller	Turks

Commanders and leaders
Raymond Berenguer	Unknown

Strength
Unknown	Unknown

Casualties and losses
Unknown	35 vessels
- Approximate location within Greece

The Battle of Megara occurred in 1359 between an alliance of the Christian states of southern Greece (the Despotate of the Morea, the Principality of Achaea, the Knights Hospitaller and the Republic of Venice), and of a Turkish raiding fleet. The battle was a victory for the allies.

== Background ==
Against the growing menace of Turkish raids in the Aegean Sea, a league was formed, probably at the initiative of Manuel Kantakouzenos, the Despot of the Morea. It comprised the Byzantines of the Morea, the bailli of the Principality of Achaea, Walter of Lor, the Signoria of the Republic of Venice, and the Knights Hospitaller of Rhodes.

== Battle ==
According to the Aragonese version of the Chronicle of the Morea, the allies campaigned in the Megarid, where their navy, composed of Venetian and Hospitaller ships (the latter under the preceptor of Kos, Raymond Berenguer), attacked a Turkish corsair fleet. The allies destroyed 35 Turkish vessels, forcing the surviving Turks to retreat to their Catalan ally, Roger de Llúria, the ruler of the Duchy of Athens. The Chronicle of the Morea asserts that after the battle, the land contingents of the participants returned home, but according to the history of John VI Kantakouzenos, Manuel's father, the allies launched an invasion of Llúria's Boeotian possessions.

== Dating ==
In 1362, Roger de Llúria found himself embroiled in a dispute with the Venetian Bailo of Negroponte, Peter Gradenigo, that soon led to war. As a result, in early 1363 he allowed Turkish mercenaries to enter his capital, Thebes. There they remained until a peace with Venice was concluded in July 1365. Accordingly, the battle was often dated to the summer of 1364, but various proposals have been made by modern scholars ranging from 1357 to 1364. The dating of the battle remains uncertain, but based on the bailliage of Walter of Lor, a date c. 1359 is most likely. With the revised chronology, it may be that the Turks Llúria allied himself with were the survivors of Megara.

== Sources ==
- Luttrell, Anthony (1975). "The Hospitallers at Rhodes, 1306–1421". In Setton, Kenneth M.; Hazard, Harry W. (eds.). A History of the Crusades, Volume III: The Fourteenth and Fifteenth Centuries. Vol. 3. Madison and London: University of Wisconsin Press. pp. 278–313. ISBN 0-299-06670-3.
- Setton, Kenneth M. (1975). "The Catalans in Greece, 1311–1388". In Setton, Kenneth M.; Hazard, Harry W. (eds.). A History of the Crusades, Volume III: The Fourteenth and Fifteenth Centuries. Vol. 3. Madison and London: University of Wisconsin Press. pp. 167–224. ISBN 0-299-06670-3.
- Topping, Peter (1975). "The Morea, 1311–1364". In Setton, Kenneth M.; Hazard, Harry W. (eds.). A History of the Crusades, Volume III: The Fourteenth and Fifteenth Centuries. Vol. 3. Madison and London: University of Wisconsin Press. pp. 104–140. ISBN 0-299-06670-3.
