= Treaty of Stralsund (1354) =

1354 treaty between Mecklenburg and Pomerania

The Treaty of Stralsund, arranged on 12 February 1354, settled border disputes resulting from the wars for Rugian succession between the duchies of Mecklenburg and Pomerania.

== See also ==
- Pomerania during the Late Middle Ages
