= Bétaille =

- Commune
- Coat of arms
- Location of Bétaille
- Location within France Location within Occitanie
- Coordinates: 44°56′41″N 1°44′04″E
- Country: France
- Region: Occitania
- Department: Lot
- Arrondissement: Gourdon
- Canton: Martel

Government
  - Mayor (2020–2026): Christian Delrieu
- Area^{1}: 13.99 km^{2} (5.40 sq mi)
- Elevation: 137 m (449 ft)
- Highest elevation: 228 m (748 ft)
- Lowest elevation: 111 m (364 ft)
- Population (2023): 1,058
  - Density: 75.63/km^{2} (195.9/sq mi)
- Time zone: UTC+01:00 (CET)
  - Summer (DST): UTC+02:00 (CEST)
- INSEE/Postal code: 46028 /46110
- ^{1} French Land Register data, which excludes lakes, ponds, glaciers > 1 km^{2} (0.386 sq mi or 247 acres) and river estuaries.

Bétaille (French pronunciation: [betaj]; Occitan: Betalha) is a commune in the Lot department in southwestern France.

== Toponymy ==
The toponym Bétaille (in Occitan Betalha) is based on the Latinized Gallic anthroponym Bitalliusor Vitalius.

== History ==
In a Cartulary de Beaulieu, from 943 to 948, a vicaire of Bétaille is mentioned as dependency of the province of Quercy.

From the 1200s until 1738, Bétaille was a châtelain of the Viscounty of Turenne. It was sold as part of the viscounty, with 25 fiefs, to the King of France on 8 May 1738. It was later sold by the king to the d'Ambert family on 4 April 1748 for 70,000 livres. It was sold again by the family on 28 April 1790. The chateau, close to the old church, was in ruins by 1748.

During the Hundred Years' War, Bétaille was captured by English forces on the 20 March 1356 (10 March 1356 old style). the English used the location to raid the areas around Martel. They remained there until August 1356.

The old church was demolished in 1871 and a new church built. In 1854, main road opened, the D803 (then the D3), below the old village. The train station opened in 1891.

== Population ==
Historical population
Year	Pop.	±% p.a.
1968	757	—
1975	776	+0.35%
1982	789	+0.24%
1990	810	+0.33%
1999	826	+0.22%
2007	970	+2.03%
2012	1,052	+1.64%
2017	1,006	−0.89%
2023	1,058	+0.84%
Source: INSEE

== See also ==
- Communes of the Lot department
