= Siege of Romorantin =

Siege during the Hundred Years' War

Coordinates: 47°21′32″N 1°44′37″E

- Part of the Black Prince's chevauchée of 1356 during the Hundred Years' War
Date	29 August – 3 September 1356
Location	Romorantin
Result	Anglo-Gascon victory

Belligerents
Kingdom of England	Kingdom of France

Commanders and leaders
Edward, the Black Prince	Jean Boucicaut, marshal of France (POW); Amaury of Craon (POW)

Strength
6,000	Unknown but small

Casualties and losses
Few	All killed or captured
- Location of Romorantin within modern France

The siege of Romorantin took place between 29 August and 3 September 1356, when an Anglo-Gascon army under the Black Prince – the eldest son and heir to King Edward III of England – assaulted the town and castle of Romorantin during the Hundred Years' War. The small French garrison was commanded by Jean Boucicaut, the marshal of France, and surrendered after six days.

The Black Prince was leading a major chevauchée – a large mounted raid – through south-west France when part of his command encountered a 300-strong French scouting force led by Boucicaut and Amaury of Craon who had previously served as royal lieutenant. The French were overwhelmed and fled, with many killed and 150 taken prisoner. Those on the swiftest horses, who included Boucicaut and Craon, reached the small walled town of Romorantin 5 miles (8 km) to the north, where they took refuge. The Anglo-Gascons concentrated their army here and captured the town and then the attached castle, forcing the garrison back into the unusually strong keep. Repeated assaults were beaten back, but the keep was set on fire, forcing the French to surrender.

Two weeks later the Anglo-Gascons won the battle of Poitiers, capturing John II, the French king. After three years of fruitless negotiations to end the war and ransom John the English invaded France again in 1359. In 1360 the Treaty of Brétigny was agreed, by which vast areas of France were ceded to England, to be personally ruled by the Black Prince, and John was ransomed for three million gold écu.

== Background ==
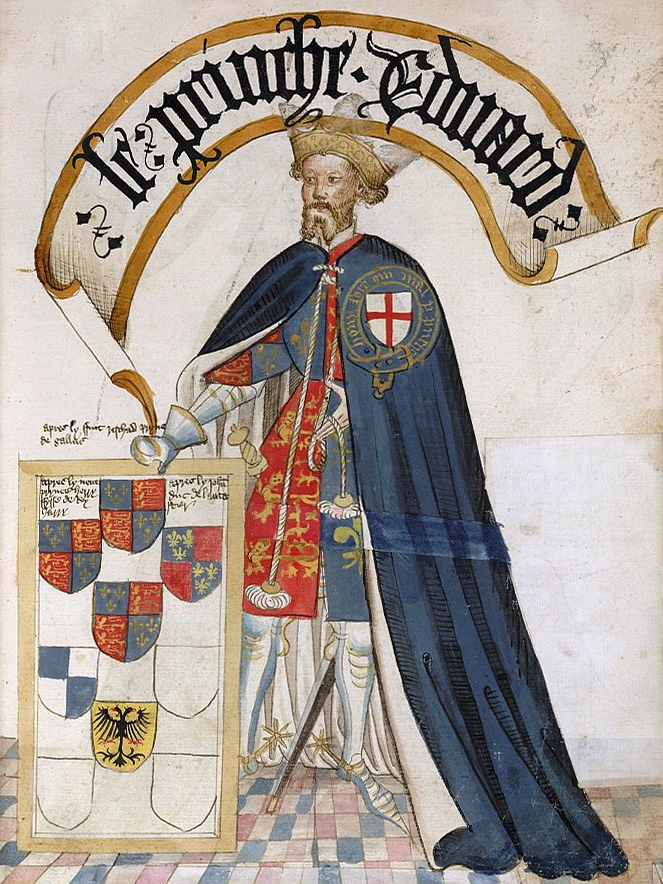
Edward, the Black Prince

Since the Norman Conquest of 1066, English monarchs had held titles and lands within France, the possession of which made them vassals of the kings of France. Following a series of disagreements between Philip VI of France (r. 1328–1350) and Edward III of England (r. 1327–1377), on 24 May 1337 Philip's Great Council in Paris agreed that the lands held by Edward III in France should be taken back into Philip's hands on the grounds that Edward III was in breach of his obligations as a vassal. This marked the start of the Hundred Years' War, which was to last 116 years.

Edward's eldest son, Edward of Woodstock, later commonly known as the Black Prince, was given command in Gascon in 1355 and arrived there on 20 September accompanied by 2,200 English soldiers. Gascon nobles reinforced him to a strength of somewhere between 5,000 and 6,000 and provided a bridging train (Note: A bridging train is an assemblage of bridge-making equipment which is mobile and which can be rapidly assembled to bridge rivers.) and a substantial supply train. The Black Prince set out on 5 October on a chevauchée, which was a large-scale mounted raid. The Anglo-Gascon force marched from Bordeaux, the capital of Gascony, 300 miles (500 km) to Narbonne and back to Gascony, devastating a wide swathe of French territory and sacking many French towns on the way. The local French forces avoided battle and there was little fighting. The expedition returned to Gascony on 2 December having marched 675 miles (1,100 km). No territory had been captured, but enormous economic damage was done to France; the modern historian Clifford Rogers concluded "the importance of the economic attrition of the chevauchée can hardly be exaggerated."

The English component resumed the offensive after Christmas to great effect, with more than 50 French-held towns or fortifications captured during the following four months. Local French commanders attempted no countermeasures and several members of the local French nobility went over to the English. Money and enthusiasm for the war were running out in France. The modern historian Jonathan Sumption describes the French national administration as "fall[ing] apart in jealous acrimony and recrimination". A contemporary chronicler recorded "the King of France was severely hated in his own realm". Arras rebelled and killed loyalists. The major nobles of Normandy refused to pay taxes and on 5 April 1356 King John II of France, Philip's son and heir, arrested several of their leaders, executing four. Several Norman nobles turned to Edward for assistance.

== Prelude ==
Map showing the routes of the Anglo-Gascon and French armies

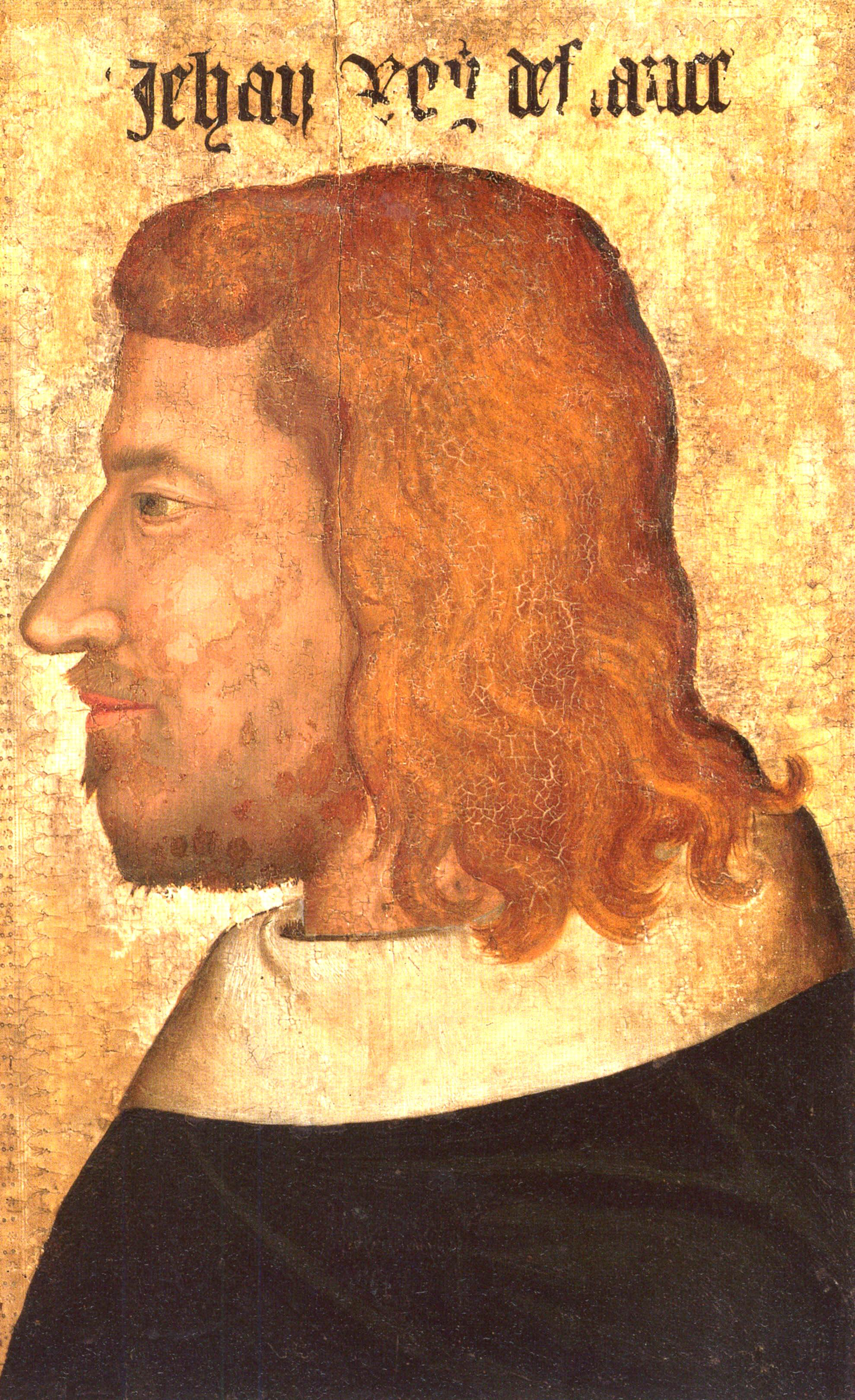
Contemporary image of John II

The French announced an arrière-ban, a formal call to arms for all able-bodied males, on 14 May 1356. The response was unenthusiastic and the call was repeated in late May and again in early June. The French were so short of cash they were unable to pay wages to those men who did muster. The Black Prince received reinforcements of men, horses, food and materiel during the spring. (Note: Records of the details of some of the items shipped survive. For example, more than 57,000 bowstrings were ordered.) Ralph, Earl of Stafford, arrived in mid-June with further reinforcements and supplies. The main French army was in Normandy where John committed it to a siege of Breteuil, the last rebel-held fortification holding out against him in eastern Normandy. Little progress was made, as Breteuil was well garrisoned and had food for a year. The French attempted to mine under the walls, to no avail.

The force which the Black Prince led north contained some 6,000 fighting men: 3,000 English and Gascon men-at-arms; (Note: The men-at-arms of both armies were, broadly, knights or knights in training. They were drawn from the landed gentry and ranged from great lords to the relatives and attendants of minor landowners. They needed to be able to equip themselves with a full suit of armour and a warhorse.) 2,000 archers, almost entirely English and Welsh longbowmen; and 1,000 other infantry, predominately Gascons. They were accompanied by approximately 4,000 non-combatants. All the fighting men were mounted, including those who would only fight on foot, such as the archers.

The Anglo-Gascon army then separated into three divisions, known as battles, and marching abreast of each other began to systematically devastate the countryside. There would be approximately 40 miles (64 km) between the flanking units, enabling the army to devastate a band of French territory more than 50 miles (80 km) wide yet be able to unite to face an enemy at approximately a day's notice. They advanced slowly, to facilitate their tasks of looting and ruin. The modern historian David Green has described the progress of the Black Prince's army as "deliberately destructive, extremely brutal ... methodical and sophisticated." Several strong castles were assaulted and captured. Fortifications which were too strong to storm, or which repulsed the first attack, were bypassed – to avoid leaving parts of the Anglo-Gascon army behind. The populaces of most towns fled, or surrendered at the first sight of Anglo-Gascon troops. Overall, the French offered little resistance and there was no field army to prevent the Prince's forces from dispersing widely to maximise their effect on the French countryside.

The main French army remained in Normandy. Despite it being clear Breteuil could be neither stormed nor starved, John felt that capturing the place was a matter of honour. At some point in August the French pushed an unusually large belfry, or mobile siege tower, up to the walls of Breteuil and launched a large assault. The defenders set fire to the belfry and repulsed the attack. Eventually, around 20 August, John offered the garrison of Breteuil free passage to the Cotentin, a huge bribe, and permission to take their valuables and goods, which persuaded them to vacate the town. The French army promptly marched south, as all available forces were concentrated against the Black Prince.

The Anglo-Gascons were advancing in the general direction of Bourges, a large and well-fortified town where the Count of Poitiers had brought a small French army from Languedoc and was rallying additional forces. Poitiers retreated in front of the Anglo-Gascons; a division of the Anglo-Gascon army tried and failed to take the town, then burnt the suburbs and continued north. This division reached Aubigny, 30 miles (48 km) to the north, by 28 August, which was looted and razed. Anglo-Gascon forces probed to the north, searching for a place where their army could cross the Loire. But it had been a wet summer, causing the river to flow too fast and be too deep to be forded and the French had destroyed all bridges which they were not certain they could defend. The same day a large French scouting party was driven off near Aubigny with losses. Some distance to the south the central component of the Black Price's division passed through Châteauroux, where it was decided to press on after the more advance divisions rather than besiege the town's castle.

== Siege ==
There were a series of running battles on 29 August. In the morning another French scouting party was defeated. From prisoners taken during this encounter the Black Prince learnt that the main French army was on the move and approaching Orléans, and that John hoped to bring the Prince to battle near Tours; this fitted well with the Black Prince's plan, which hinged on persuading the French to give battle. Later a group of Anglo-Gascon foragers were captured by a French force possibly consisting of 300 men-at-arms, led by Jean Boucicaut, the marshal of France, and Amaury of Craon, who had previously served as royal lieutenant. In turn English reinforcements arrived; the French were overwhelmed and fled, with many killed and 150 taken prisoner. Those on the swiftest horses, who included Boucicaut and Craon, reached the small walled town of Romorantin 5 miles (8 km) to the north, where they took refuge. The town was on the north bank of the River Sauldre. The town walls were in poor condition, no stocks of food for a garrison or horses had been stockpiled, and the town possessed no source of water beyond what may have been stored in cisterns. The town did have a small castle attached to it, which in turn possessed a strong keep – known as the "Dongoun".

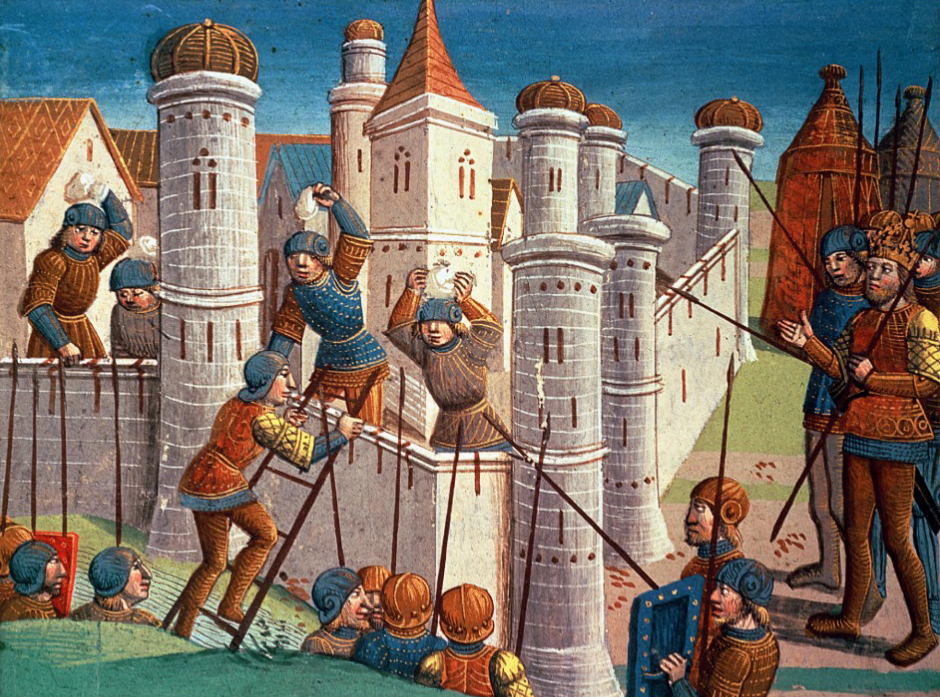
A Medieval depiction of a fortification being assaulted

The Anglo-Gascon pursuers took the town on the run and stormed the castle the following day. The French withdrew to the keep. The Anglo-Gascon commanders conferred and decided to lay siege to the keep. The change in strategy was because of the belief that the main French army was nearby and prepared to fight. The Black Prince wished to engage the French in an open battle and hoped that the Anglo-Gascons could gain the substantial advantage of the defensive by luring the French into a premature attack as they attempted to relieve Boucicaut and Craon. (Note: Historians have pointed out the similarities between the siege of Romorantin and the English sieges during the previous 23 years of Berwick, Cambrai and Tournai; all were undertaken as attempts to draw an opposing army into battle.) The garrison may have been permitted to send a message to John explaining their plight. In fact John was still at Chartres assembling the French army and attempting to raise the money to pay for it; he was not inclined to rush into battle.

The three divisions of the Anglo-Gascon force concentrated at Romorantin. Three mobile siege towers were constructed and repeated assaults were launched against the keep. On 31 August two senior Gascon knights were killed in unsuccessful assaults. On 1 September three separate attacks were made, each from several sides at once so as to spread the defenders thin; all were repulsed. Further direct attacks were eschewed and attempts were made to both mine under the walls of the keep and to set it on fire. By 3 September the keep was fiercely ablaze and it was clear to the garrison that they were not going to be succoured.

The French gave up the keep and yielded themselves to the Prince's discretion. By the norms of the time the Black Prince could have had them killed out of hand. Instead they were all freed, on condition that they did not fight against the English again until they had paid hefty ransoms. (Note: Boucicaut had been captured by the English twice before in the previous five years.) The Anglo-Gascon army waited for another day at Romorantin in case the French army were to belatedly turn up, before marching off towards Tours on 4 September. Rogers suggests that a provocative message was given to Boucicaut to pass to King John, chiding him for his assumed cowardice in failing to come to the rescue of his liegemen.

== Aftermath ==
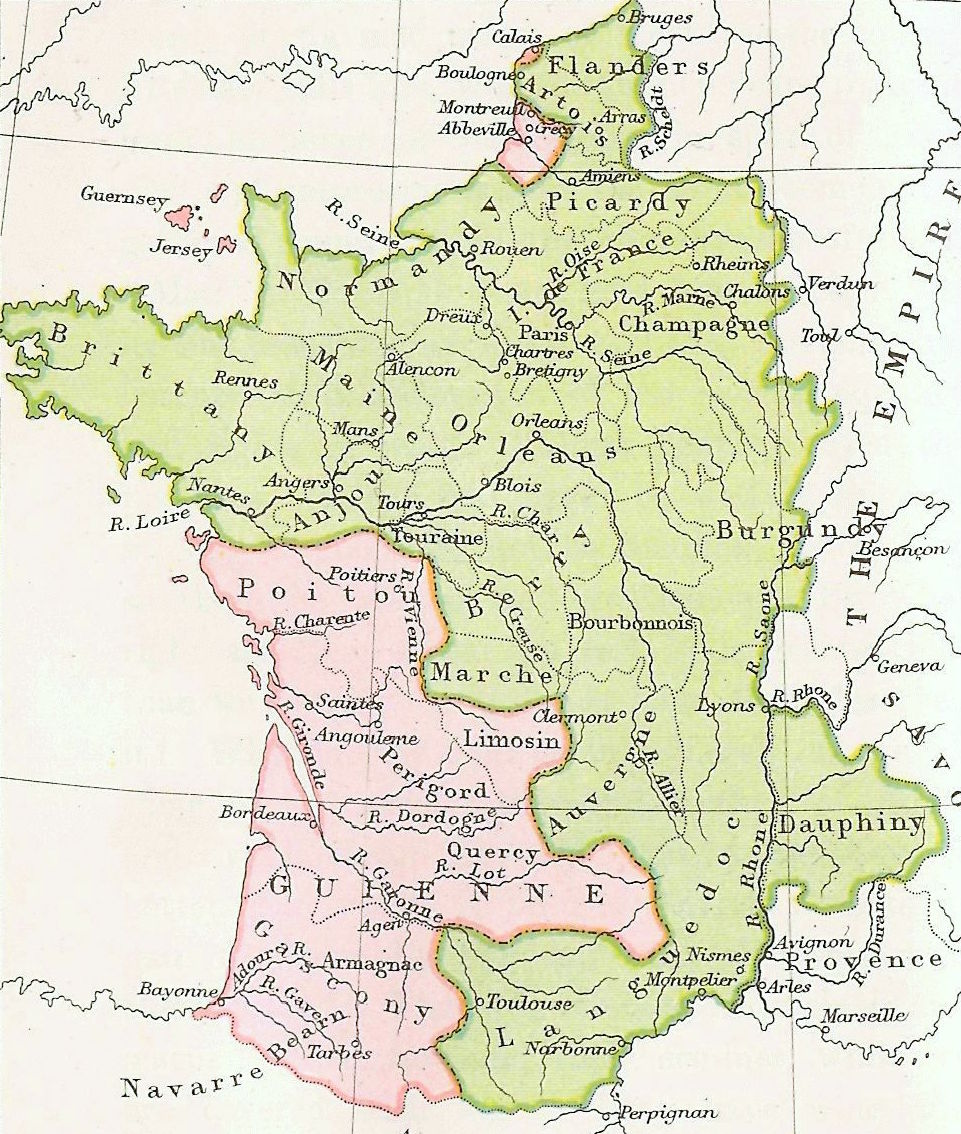
France after the 1360 Treaty of Brétigny; French territory in green, English territory in pink

The Anglo-Gascon army penetrated as far as the suburbs of Tours, then withdrew, pursued by the main French army, 11,000 strong, under John II. The English were forced to battle on 19 September at Poitiers, where they decisively defeated the French and captured John II. In the aftermath of the battle English and Gascon forces raided widely across France, against little or no opposition. With no effective central authority France dissolved into near anarchy.

Protracted negotiations between John and Edward III failed to reach an acceptable treaty. A peasant revolt known as the jacquerie broke out in northern France during the spring of 1358 and was bloodily put down in June. In October 1359 Edward III led another campaign in northern France. It was unopposed by French forces but was unable to take any strongly fortified places. On 8 May 1360 the Treaty of Brétigny was agreed, by which vast areas of France were ceded to England, to be personally ruled by the Black Prince, and John was ransomed for three million gold écu. (Note: This was £500,000, the equivalent of the peacetime income of the English crown for about 15 years.) Rogers states "Edward gained territories comprising a full third of France, to be held in full sovereignty, along with a huge ransom for the captive King John – his original war aims and much more." At the time it seemed this was the end of the war, but large-scale fighting broke out again in 1369 and the Hundred Years' War did not end until 1453, with a French victory which left only Calais in English hands.

== Notes, citations and sources ==
=== Sources ===
- Burne, Alfred (1999) [1955]. The Crecy War. Ware, Hertfordshire: Wordsworth Editions. ISBN 978-1-84022-210-4.
- Curry, Anne (2002). The Hundred Years' War 1337–1453 (PDF). Oxford: Osprey Publishing (published 13 November 2002). ISBN 978-1-84176-269-2. Archived from the original (PDF) on 27 September 2018.
- Green, David (2011). The Black Prince. New York: History Press. ISBN 978-0-7524-7306-2.
- Hewitt, Herbert J. (2004) [1958]. The Black Prince's Expedition of 1355-1357. Barnsley: Pen & Sword. ISBN 978-1-84415-217-9.
- Hoskins, Peter (2011). In the Steps of the Black Prince: The Road to Poitiers, 1355–1356. Woodbridge, Suffolk: Boydell. ISBN 978-1-84383-611-7.
- Hoskins, Peter (2022). Siege Warfare During the Hundred Years War: 'Once More Unto the Breach'. Yorkshire; Philadelphia: Pen & Sword. ISBN 9-781-39907-476-6.
- Madden, Mollie (2018). The Black Prince and the Grande Chevauchée of 1355. Woodbridge, Suffolk: Boydell. ISBN 978-1-78327-356-0.
- Prestwich, Michael (2007). Plantagenet England 1225–1360. Oxford: Oxford University Press. ISBN 978-0-19-922687-0.
- Rogers, Clifford J. (1994). "Edward III and the Dialectics of Strategy, 1327-1360". Transactions of the Royal Historical Society. 4: 83–102. doi:10.2307/3679216. JSTOR 3679216. OCLC 931311378.
- Rogers, Clifford J. (2014) [2000]. War Cruel and Sharp: English Strategy under Edward III, 1327–1360. Woodbridge, Suffolk: Boydell Press. ISBN 978-0-85115-804-4.
- Sumption, Jonathan (1990). Trial by Battle. The Hundred Years War. Vol. I. London: Faber and Faber. ISBN 978-0-571-20095-5.
- Sumption, Jonathan (1999). Trial by Fire. The Hundred Years War. Vol. II. London: Faber and Faber. ISBN 978-0-571-13896-8.
- Wagner, John A. (2006). Encyclopedia of the Hundred Years War. Westport, CT, US: Greenwood Press. ISBN 978-0-313-32736-0.
