= Golden Bull of 1356 =

Decree of the Holy Roman Empire

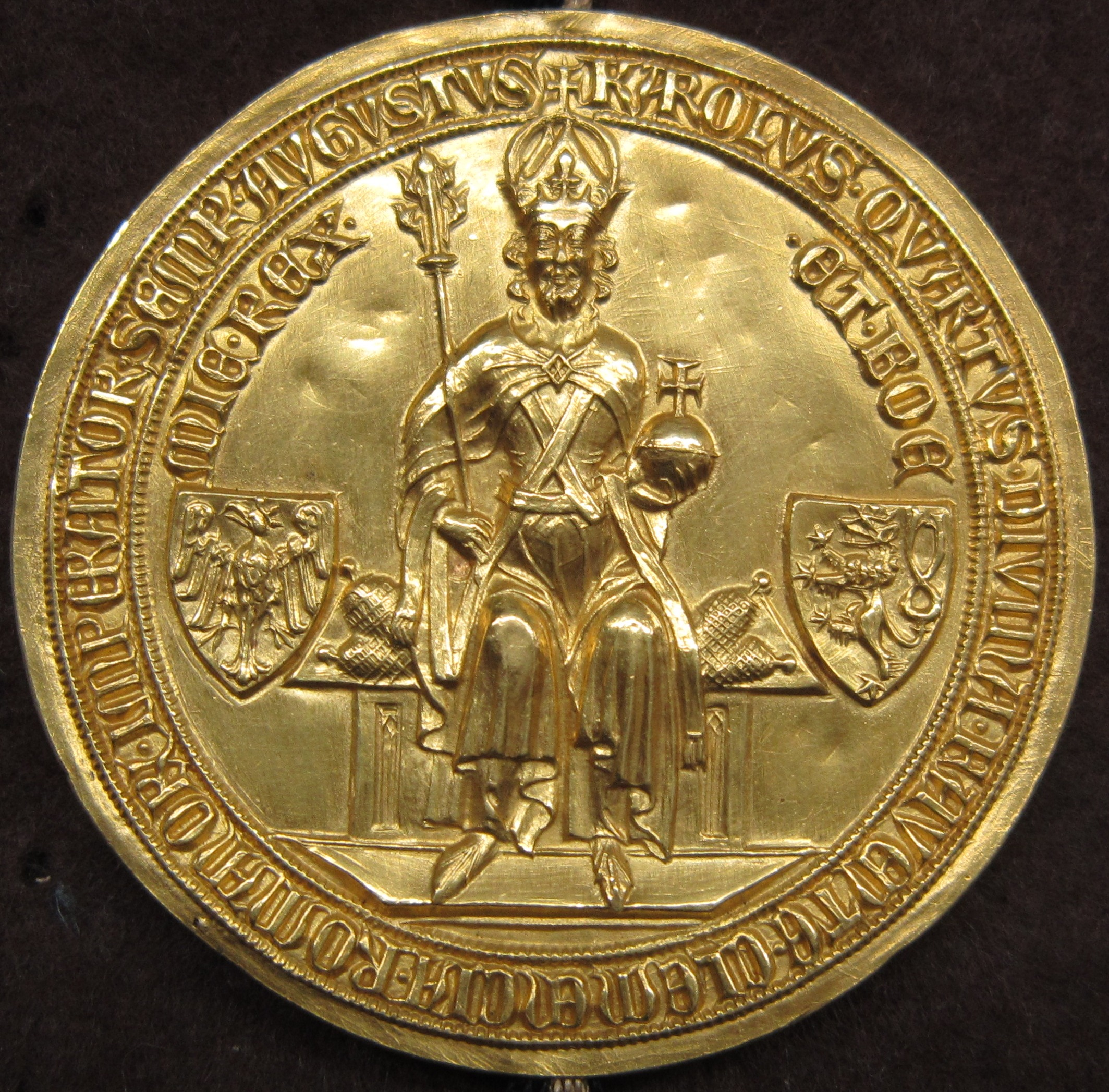
- The golden seal that earned the decree its name
- Created: 10 January 1356 (chapters 1–23); 25 December 1356 (chapters 24–31)
- Location: Austrian State Archives, Vienna (Bohemian and Mainz editions); Academic library of the Darmstadt University of Technology (Cologne edition); Bavarian State Archives, Munich (Electorate of the Palatinate edition and Nuremberg copy); Baden-Württemberg Main State Archives, Stuttgart (Trier edition); Frankfurt Institute for the History of the City (copy)
- Author(s): Delegates of the Imperial Diet held in Nuremberg and Metz
- Signatories: Charles IV
- Purpose: Franchise of the seven Prince-electors voting for the King of the Romans

The Golden Bull of 1356 (Note: German: Goldene Bulle (German pronunciation: [ˈɡɔldənə ˈbʊlə]), Czech: Zlatá bula, Italian: Bolla d'oro, Latin: Bulla Aurea Luxembourgish: Gëllene Bull), was a decree issued by the Imperial Diet at Nuremberg and Metz (Diet of Metz, 1356/57) headed by the Emperor Charles IV which fixed, for a period of more than four hundred years, important aspects of the constitutional structure of the Holy Roman Empire. It was named the Golden Bull for the golden seal it carried.

In June 2013, the Golden Bull was included in the UNESCO's Memory of the World Register.

== Background ==
According to the written text of the Golden Bull of 1356:

We have promulgated, decreed and recommended for ratification the subjoined laws for the purpose of cherishing unity among the Electors, and of bringing about a unanimous election, and of closing all approach to the aforesaid detestable discord and to the various dangers which arise from it.

Though the election of the King of the Romans by the chief ecclesiastical and secular princes of the Holy Roman Empire was well established, disagreements about the process and papal involvement had repeatedly resulted in controversies, most recently in 1314 when Louis of Bavaria and Frederick of Austria had been elected by opposing sets of electors. Louis, who had eventually subdued his rival's claim on the battlefield, made a first attempt to clarify the process in the Declaration of Rhense of 1338, which renounced any papal involvement and had restricted the right to choose a new king to the prince-electors. The Golden Bull, promulgated by Louis's successor and rival, Charles IV, was more precise in several ways.

== Prince-electors ==
Firstly, the Bull explicitly named the seven Prince-electors (Kurfürsten) who were to choose the King and also defined the Reichserzämter, their (largely ceremonial) offices at court:

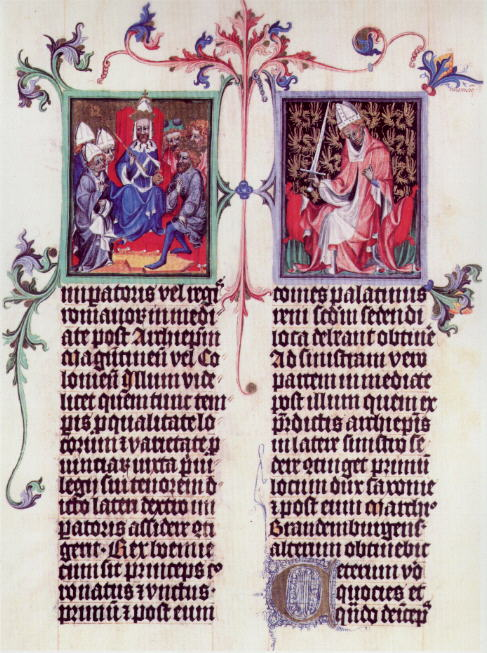
Page from the Golden Bull manuscript of King Wenceslaus, about 1400, Austrian National Library

Class	Prince-elector	Court office	Sequence of voting
Ecclesiastical princes	Archbishop of Mainz	Archchancellor of Germany	7th
Ecclesiastical princes	Archbishop of Cologne	Archchancellor of Italy	2nd
Ecclesiastical princes	Archbishop of Trier	Archchancellor of Burgundy	1st
Secular princes	King of Bohemia	Arch-Cupbearer	3rd
Secular princes	Count Palatine of the Rhine	Arch-Steward	4th
Secular princes	Duke of Saxony-Wittenberg	Arch-Marshal	5th
Secular princes	Margrave of Brandenburg	Arch-Chamberlain	6th

Secondly, the principle of majority voting was explicitly stated for the first time in the Empire. The Bull prescribed that four (out of seven) votes would always suffice to elect a new King; as a result, three Electors could no longer block the election. Thirdly, the Electoral principalities were declared indivisible, and succession to them was regulated to ensure that the votes would never be divided. Finally, the Bull cemented a number of privileges for the Electors, confirming their elevated role in the Empire. It is therefore also a milestone in the establishment of largely independent states in the Empire, a process to be concluded only centuries later, notably with the Peace of Westphalia of 1648.

The Holy Roman Empire in 1356

This codification of prince-electors, though largely based on precedence, was not uncontroversial, especially in regard to the two chief rivals of the ruling House of Luxembourg:

- The House of Wittelsbach ruled the Duchy of Bavaria as well as the County Palatinate. Dynastic divisions had caused the two territories to devolve upon distinct branches of the house. The Treaty of Pavia, which in 1329 restored the Palatinate branch, stipulated that Bavaria and the Palatinate would alternate in future elections, but the Golden Bull fixed the electoral vote upon the Palatinate and not upon Bavaria, partly because Charles's predecessor and rival Louis IV was of that branch. Louis IV's sons, Louis V and Stephen II of Bavaria, protested this omission, feeling that Bavaria, one of the original duchies of the realm and their family's chief territory for over 170 years, deserved primacy over the Palatinate. The omission of Bavaria from the list of prince-electors also allowed Bavaria, which had only recently been reunited, to fall into dynastic fragmentation again. Brandenburg was in the hands of the Bavarian Wittelsbachs (though held by a junior member of the house) in 1356; they eventually lost the territory to the Luxemburgs in 1373, leaving the Bavarian branch without representation in the electoral college until 1623.
- The House of Habsburg, long-time rivals of the Luxembourgs, were completely omitted from the list of prince-electors, leading to decreased political influence and dynastic fragmentation. In retaliation, Duke Rudolf IV, one of the dukes of fragmented Austria, had the Privilegium Maius forged, a document supposedly issued by Emperor Frederick Barbarossa. The document gave Austria – elevated to the position of an Archduchy – special privileges, including primogeniture. While ignored by the Emperor and other princes at the time, the document was eventually ratified when Frederick of Austria himself became Emperor in the 15th century. Still, the Habsburgs remained without an electoral vote until they succeeded to the Kingdom of Bohemia in 1526.

== Procedures ==
Imperial Diet in Metz during which the Golden Bull of 1356 was issued

The bull regulated the whole election process in great detail, listing explicitly where, when, and under which circumstances what should be done by whom, not only for the prince-electors but also (for example) for the population of Frankfurt, where the elections were to be held, and also for the counts of the regions the prince-electors had to travel through to get there. The decision to hold the elections in Frankfurt reflected a traditional feeling dating from East Frankish days that both election and coronation ought to take place on Frankish soil. However, the election location was not the only specified location; the bull specified that the coronation would take place in Aachen, and Nuremberg would be the place where the first diet of a reign should be held. The elections were to be concluded within thirty days; failing that, the bull prescribed that the prince-electors were to receive only bread and water until they had decided:

Quod si facere distulerint infra triginta dies, a die prestiti juramenti prefati continuo numerandos, extunc transactis eisdem triginta diebus amodo panem manducent et aquam et nullatenus civitatem exeant antedictam, nisi prius per ipsos vel majorem partem ipsorum rector seu temporale caput fidelium electum fuerit, ut prefertur.

[Translation:] But if they shall fail to do this within thirty days, counting continuously from the day when they took the aforesaid oath: when those thirty days are over, from that time on they shall live on bread and water, and by no means leave the aforesaid city [Frankfurt] unless first through them, or the majority of them, a ruler or temporal head of the faithful shall have been elected, as was said before.

— Chapter 2, §3.

Besides regulating the election process, the chapters of the Golden Bull contained many minor decrees. For instance, it also defined the order of marching when the emperor was present, both with and without his insignia. A relatively major decision was made in chapter 15, where Charles IV outlawed any conjurationes, confederationes, and conspirationes, meaning in particular the city alliances (Städtebünde), but also other communal leagues that had sprung up through the communal movement in mediaeval Europe. Most Städtebünde were subsequently dissolved, sometimes forcibly, and where refounded, their political influence was much reduced. Thus the Golden Bull also strengthened the nobility in general to the detriment of the cities.

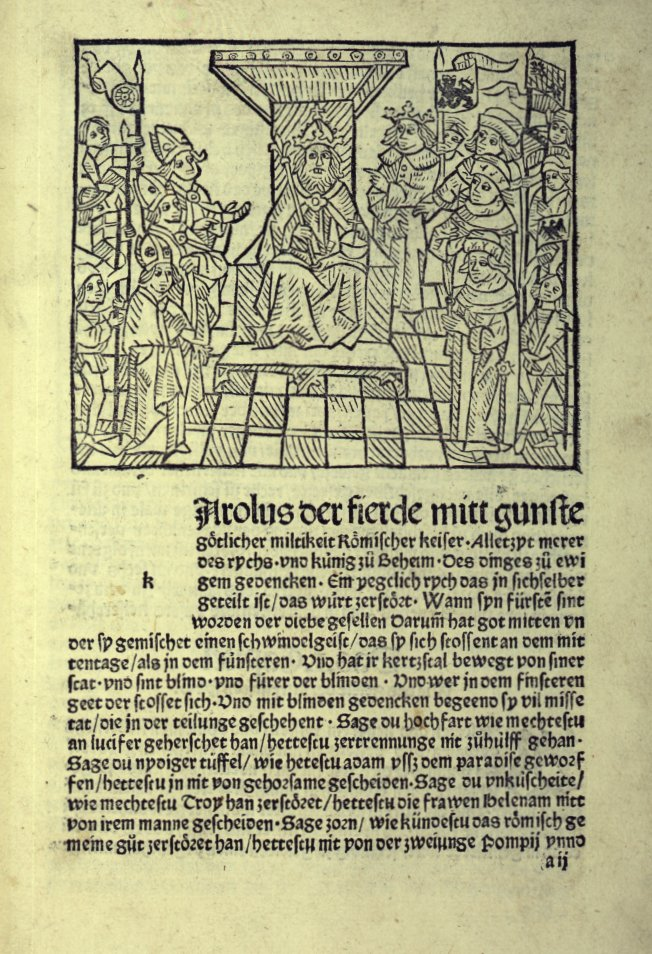
Incunable of the Golden Bull in Early New High German, late 15th century, University of Jena

The pope's involvement with the Golden Bull of 1356 was basically nonexistent, which was significant in the history of relations between the popes and the emperors. When Charles IV laid down procedure for electing a King of the Romans, he mentioned nothing about receiving papal confirmation of the election. However, Pope Innocent VI did not protest this because he needed Charles’s support against the Visconti. Pope Innocent continued to have good relations with Charles IV after the Golden Bull of 1356 until the former's death in 1362.

== Sources ==
- Bryce, James, The Holy Roman Empire (London: The Macmillan Company, A New Edition, 1978), 243.
- Chambers. D.S., Popes, Cardinals and War (London: I.B. Tauris, 2006), 28.
- Renouard, Yves, The Avignon Papacy 1305–1403 (Connecticut : Archon Books, 1970), 127.
- Heer, Friedrich, trans. Janet Sondheimer, The Holy Roman Empire (New York: Federick A. Praeger Publishers, 1968), 117.
