= 1310s =

Decade

The 1310s was a decade of the Julian Calendar which began on January 1, 1310, and ended on December 31, 1319.

== Events ==
=== 1310 ===
==== January – March ====
- January 19 – General Malik Kafur of the Delhi Sultanate begins the siege of Warangal, capital of the Kakatiya kingdom in what is now the Indian state of Telangana.
- January 26 – James II of Aragon ends the siege of Almeria after five months without taking the city.
- February 8 – The English Parliament opens at Westminster, after being summoned on October 26. The Parliament will continue to meet until April 12.
- February 9 – At Dublin, acting in his capacity as Lord of Ireland, King Edward II of England (as Éadbhard II Shasana, Tiarna Éireann) opens the first session of the Parliament of Ireland during his administration. The Irish Parliament will hold 14 sessions before being dismissed in 1326.
- February 24 – A group of 12 Scottish Catholic bishops, including William Sinclair, Bishop of Dunkeld, swear fealty to Robert the Bruce, King of Scotland.
- March 3 – Konrad I of Oleśnica and his brother Boleslaw, sons and heirs of Henry III, Duke of Głogów renounce their rights to Gdańsk Pomerania (now part of Poland) in return for payment by the principality of Brandenburg, ruled by the Margrave Heinrich I.
- March 5 – Baybars II, Sultan of the Mamluks in Egypt, is driven from office by an angry mob consisting of supporters of his predecessor, An-Nasir Muhammad. Baybars is located and turned over to Sultan Nasir.
- March 20 – Having secured the surrender of King Prataparudra of Kakatiya during the siege of Warangal, General Malik Kafur of the Delhi Sultanate begins his return journey to Delhi. He will arrive on June 23.

==== April – June ====
- April 8 – The return of the Kingdom of Hungary's Crown of Saint Stephen is successfully negotiated at Szeged by Thomas II, Archbishop of Esztergom, along with Amadeus Aba and Dominic II Rátót to secure its return from Ladislaus III Kán, the Voivode of Transylvania.
- April 13 – In Burma, Athinkhaya, one of the three brothers serving as regents of the Kingdom of Myinsaing in present-day central Burma (Myanmar), dies at the age of 49, leaving his brothers Thihathu and Yazathingyan in control. Thihathu will soon be the sole ruler of Burma.
- April 15 – Sultan An-Nasir Muhammad of Egypt has his predecessor, the former Sultan Baybars II, executed.
- May 9 – Nephon I of Constantinople becomes the new Patriarch of the Eastern Orthodox Church in Byzantium, now at Turkey. He is elected after his predecessor, the 80-year-old Athanasius I, is forced to retire.
- May 12 – In France, 54 members of the Knights Templar are burned at the stake for heresy at Paris, on orders of King Philip IV of France (Philip the Fair). Pope Clement V attempts to take control of the situation by issuing a papal bull, to assert the Church's authority over the matter and demands Philip turn over the Templars and their property to ecclesiastical officials, who will then try the Templars for charges themselves. (→ Trials of the Knights Templar)
- May 25 – Otto III, Duke of Carinthia, dies and is succeeded by his younger brother, King Henry of Bohemia, Margrave of Moravia and the nominal King of Poland.
- May 26 – Siege of Algeciras: Castilian forces abandon the siege as King Ferdinand IV of Castile ("Ferdinand the Summoned") sign a seven-year peace treaty with Abu al-Juyush Nasr, Sultan of Granada. Nasr agrees to pay an indemnity of 150,000 gold doblas and an annual tribute of 11,000 doblas to Castile. He yields some frontier towns, including Quesada and Bedmar. In accordance with the terms, Nasr becomes a vassal of Castile and provides up to 3 months of military service per year if summoned. Markets will be opened between Castile and Granada – Ferdinand appoints a "judge of the frontiers" (juez de la frontera) to adjudicate disputes between Christians and Muslims in the border regions.
- June 15 – Tiepolo conspiracy: Leading Venetian nobles led by Bajamonte Tiepolo organise a conspiracy against Doge Pietro Gradenigo. Their plot fails due to treachery and the rebels are defeated near Piazza San Marco by forces faithful to the doge. During their retreat to the San Polo sestiere, the Rialto Bridge is burnt down. Later, Tiepolo surrenders himself and is exiled to Istria. The suppression of the revolt will lead to the creation of the Council of Ten.
- June 23 – General Malik Kafur arrives at Delhi and presents to Sultan Alauddin the treasures captured from Warrangal.

==== July – September ====
- July 1 – The Citadel of Erbil, headquarters of a rebellion by 10,000 Eastern Christians and located in what is now Iraq, is captured after a siege by the Mongol Ilkhanate, and the defenders are massacred.
- July 10 – The Council of Ten (or simply "the Ten"), Il Consiglio dei Dieci is created to govern the Republic of Venice, by decree of Pietro Gradenigo, Doge of Venice. The council, the inner circle of oligarchical patricians, initially investigates the conspiracy of Bajamonte Tiepolo.
- August 27 – The third coronation of Károly Róbert I (Charles I) as King of Hungary is carried out at Székesfehérvár by Thomas II, Archbishop of Esztergom after the Archbishop successfully negotiates the return of the Crown of Saint Stephen from Ladislaus Kán. Use of the Holy Crown had been required by Hungarian law for recognition by the nobles of Hungary.
- September 1 – John of Luxemburg, younger brother of King Henry of Bohemia, marries Princess Elizabeth, the daughter of the late King Wenceslaus II.
- September 20 – King Edward II of England reaches Roxburgh after starting his invasion of the Kingdom of Scotland "in the third week of September". The campaign is fruitless, even though English forces under Piers Gaveston manage to reach as far north as Perth.

==== October – December ====
- October 1 – Writing from Kildrum, King Robert the Bruce of Scotland attempts to establish peace talks with King Edward II of England (who is encamped in Scotland at Biggar) but Edward refuses to negotiate.
- November 23 – Abu Sa'id Uthman II becomes the new Sultan of Morocco upon the death of his nephew, the Sultan Abu al-Rabi Sulayman.
- December 3 – Prague, capital of the Kingdom of Bohemia, is captured and King Henry of Bohemia is deposed by his brother, John of Luxemburg, who will later be known as "John the Blind".
- December 10 – Stephen I, Duke of Bavaria, one of the three brothers ruling the southern German duchy within the Roman Empire, dies, leaving his older brothers Otto III and Louis III as the dual rulers.
- December 11 – In Poland, Henry the Faithful becomes the new duke of Silesia and of much of Wielkopolska ("Greater Poland", now part of northwestern Poland as Henry IV, upon the death of his father, Henry III, Duke of Głogów. Wielkopolska is divided between Henry III's sons, Henry IV, Konrad I of Oleśnica, Bolesław of Oleśnica, John, Duke of Ścinawa and Przemko II, with the Duchy of Glogow given to his wife, Matilda of Brunswick-Lüneburg. Wielkopolska will be conquered in 1314.

==== By place ====
====== Europe ======
- Spring – Castilian forces abandon the siege of Algeciras after six months and begin negotiations with Granada. Ferdinand and Sultan sign a peace treaty for seven years on May 26.
- Summer – Count Charles of Valois founds the Diocese of Corfu, Zakynthos and Cephalonia with its seat in Corfu. It is, comprising the Ionian Islands of Corfu, Zakynthos and Cephalonia.

====== Asia ======
- Spring – Siege of Warangal: Delhi forces led by Malik Kafur conquer the fortress of Warangal after a month-long siege. Rudradeva II, Indian ruler of the Kakatiya Dynasty, negotiates a truce and surrenders a huge amount of wealth to send to the Delhi Sultanate.

==== By topic ====
====== Education ======
- The first purpose-built accommodation for students (the Mob Quad) is completed at Merton College, Oxford, England.

=== 1311 ===
==== January – March ====
- January 6 – Henry VII, the future Holy Roman Emperor, is crowned King of Italy in Milan with a mock-up of the Iron crown of Lombardy. The Tuscan Guelphs refuse to attend the ceremony and begin preparing for resistance against Henry's rule. Henry approves the despotic regimes of Matteo I Visconti in Milan and Cangrande I della Scala in Verona. The cities of Piedmont and Lombardy submit to Henry – in accordance with the proclaimed program of peace and justice. Florence and their Guelph (anti-imperialist) allies in Tuscany and Romagna move to defend themselves against Henry's accession.
- February 12 – Milan Uprising: German forces under Baldwin of Luxembourg (brother of Henry VII) crush the Italian Guelph troops, led by Guido della Torre in Milan. A contingent of Teutonic Knights kills and disperses most of the rebels in a single cavalry charge. Guido della Torre escapes, and is condemned to death in absence by Henry.
- March 15 – The Battle of Halmyros is fought in Greece as the mercenaries of the Catalan Company defeat the Latin forces (some 15,000 men), and their allies under Walter V at Halmyros (southern Thessaly). After the battle, they take control of the Duchy of Athens. Later, Catalan forces peacefully occupy all of Attica and Boeotia, which they rule as part of Greece (until the 1380s).
- March 20 – King Ferdinand IV, known as "Ferdinand the Summoned", grants new privileges to the Catholic Church within the Kingdom of Castile during an assembly at Palencia. In April, Ferdinand becomes seriously ill and is transferred to Valladolid, despite the opposition of his wife, Queen Constance, who wishes to transfer him to Carrión de los Condes (northern Spain).

==== April – June ====
- April 7
  - In Asia, Ayurbarwada Buyantu Khan is proclaimed as the Mongol Emperor Renzong of Yuan Dynasty China, 10 weeks after the death of his brother, Külüg Khan.
  - Battle of Woplauken: In Europe, the Teutonic Knights defeat the Grand Duchy of Lithuania.
- April 26 – King Henry VII of Italy razes the city walls of Cremona after suppressing the rebellion of the Torriani family against his rule.
- April 27 – Pope Clement V, having decided to let the Council of Vienne determine the question of whether the late Pope Boniface VIII had been guilty of heresy, officially excuses King Philip IV of France from any condemnation of Boniface.
- May 29 – Sancho the Peaceful of Barcelona becomes the new King of Majorca, a set of islands in the Mediterranean Sea (now Spain's Balearic Islands) after the death of his father, King Jaume II
- June 9 – The painting Maestà the master work of the Italian artist Duccio di Buoninsegna, is unveiled at the Siena Cathedral in the Republic of Siena.
- June 11 – Boleslaw III the Wasteful, Duke of Wroclaw, renounces his claims to the throne of the Kingdom of Poland
- June 25 – Matthew III Csák, the Palatine of Hungary, attempts to expand his territory within the kingdom and pillages the area around the town of Buda (now half of the city of Budapest.

==== July – September ====
- July 6
  - Bolad, who had served as the Mongol Empire's representative in the Middle East as Ikhanate, is appointed as the Duke of Ze by the Mongol Emperor of Yuan dynasty China, Ayurbarwada Buyantu Khan
  - Eleven days after beginning his siege of Buda, Matthew III Csak is excommunicated by Gentile Portino da Montefiore, the Roman Catholic Cardinal sent by Pope Clement V.
- July 13 – Matteo I Visconti is restored to rule over the Duchy of Milan after purchasing the title of imperial vicar from the new King of Italy, Henry VII.
- July 25 – At Algeciras a fleet of Marinid ships, arrives after being sent by Morocco's Sultan Abu Sa'id Uthman II, who was attempting to restore the Muslim presence.
- August 13 – Pietro Gradenigo, Doge of the Republic of Venice since 1289, dies after a reign of 22 years. Marino Zorzi is elected by the Venetian nobles to replace Gradenigo as the republic's chief executive officer.
- August 16 – The Parliament of England presents the Ordinances of 1311 to King Edward II (document dated 5 October; published on 11 October); these substitute the 21 Lord Ordainers for the King as the effective government of the country.
- September 5 – In the northeastern part of the Kingdom of Hungary, in what is now the Republic of Slovakia, the oligarch Amadeus Aba is assassinated by rebels at the south gate of Košice.
- September 16 – After a four-month siege, Guelph rebels in the Italian city of Brescia surrender to Cangrande I della Scala, Lord of Verona and officer of King Henry VII.

==== October – December ====
- October 3 – Peace is restored in northeastern Hungary as the envoys of King Charles I arbitrate and agreement between the rebels at Košice and the two sons of the late Amadeus Aba, Amadeus II and Dominic.
- October 11 – The Ordinances of 1311 are published in England by King Edward II, restricting the power of the monarchs of England.
- October 16 – Council of Vienne: Pope Clement V convokes the 15th Ecumenical Council at Vienne, France, in the presence of 20 cardinals, about 100 archbishops and bishops, and a number of abbots and priors. The main item on the agenda of the council is the Order of the Knights Templar. Clement passes papal bulls to dissolve the Templar Order, confiscate their lands, and label them as heretics.
- October 28 – King Ferdinand IV of Castile signs the Concord of Palencia with the principal magnates of the rest of the kingdom (including his brother, Prince John of Castile), promising to respect the customs and privileges of the subjects of his towns, and as well as to not deprive the nobles of the rents and lands that belong to the Crown.
- November 5 – Eight days after the signing of the Concord of Palencia, John of Castile violates his promise to his nephew Ferdinand IV and enters into an alliance with Juan Núñez II de Lara.
- November 13 – (1 Ocho, 22nd day of 9th month) Munenobu Hojo becomes the regent for the Kamakura Shogunate (to July 1312).
- November 23 – Pope Clement V appoints Jens Grand, the Danish-born Prince-Archbishopric of Bremen, as the arbiter of a dispute between the Archbishopric of Riga (at the time of Terra Mariana, now the Republic of Latvia) and Teutonic Prussia (now part of Poland).
- November 29 – Alboino I della Scala, the Lord of Verona, dies and is succeeded by his brother Cangrande.
- December 26 – Al-Mahdi Muhammad bin al-Mutahhar, the Shi'ite Muslim Imam of the Zaidiyyah state in Yemen, leads Zaidi troops to victory in a battle in the Sheref district against the Sunni Muslim Rasulid sultanate that dominates most of Yemen. A 10-year ceasefire agreement is brokered between Zaidiyyah and the Rasulid Sultan al-Mu'ayyad Da'udsultan.

=== 1312 ===
==== January – March ====
- January 13 – English royal favourite Piers Gaveston, having returned secretly from two months exile on the continent, is reunited, probably at Knaresborough Castle, with King Edward II, who on January 18 restores all Gaveston's confiscated lands to him. They plan to travel to Scotland to seek help from King Robert the Bruce.
- February 7 – In Scotland, Dungal MacDouall is forced to surrender Dumfries Castle to the forces of King Robert the Bruce. Despite having helped in the murder of King Robert's brothers in 1308, Dungal is allowed to go into exile rather than being put to death.
- February 20 – Öljaitü, the Ikhanate of the Mongol Empire's territory in the Middle East, carries out a purge of corrupt officials, with the arrest and execution of his vizier, Sa'd al-Din Savaji and one of Sa'd al-Din's closest aides, Taj al-Din Avaji,
- February 29 – The division of Greater Poland (Wielkopolska) is carried out by the sons of Henry III, Duke of Silesia-Glogau, with Konrad I and Bolesław receiving the eastern portion of Henry III's lands, and Henry IV, Jan and Przemko II retaining the rest.
- March 9 – Beatrice, Countess of Montfort, French noblewoman and co-ruler of Montfort, dies and is succeeded as Countess by her daughter Yolande of Dreux, former Queen consort of Scotland and wife of Arthur II, Duke of Brittany.
- March 22 – Pope Clement V, under pressure from King Philip IV of France, officially disbands the Order of the Knights Templar at the Council of Vienne, issuing the bull Vox in excelso. The Order's property and monetary assets are given to a rival order, the Knights Hospitaller. Meanwhile, Jacques de Molay, last Grand Master of the Knights Templar, is held in prison in Paris, where he is forced to commit false confessions.

==== April – June ====
- April 4 – At the Council of Vienne in France, a future Christian Crusade against a Muslim nation is approved by the 180 participants in the 15th Roman Catholic ecumenical council (including 20 cardinals and 122 bishops), convened by Pope Clement V. While agreeing that a Crusade should take place within one year, the parties disagree over where it should take place, with suggestions of attacking the Spanish Emirate of Granada, the Armenian Kingdom of Cilicia, or the Sultanate of Egypt. Although tithes will be collected from Catholic churches to support the venture, the proposed crusade never takes place.
- April 10 – The threat of a takeover by the Kingdom of France against the sovereign French Archdiocese of Lyon is ended when the Archbishop Pierre de Savoie signs a treaty granting King Philip the Fair the authority to administer the Lyon courts and law enforcement system.
- April 14 – In Germany, Frederick I, Margrave of Meissen signs the Treaty of Tangermünde after having been captured by Waldemar the Great of Brandenburg. Under the treaty, Meissen cedes its territory between the Elbe River and the Elster River to Brandenburg, and Frederick the Brave pays 32,000 silver coins to Waldemar.
- May 1 – Mladen II Šubić of Bribir becomes the new Ban of Croatia upon the death of his father, Paul I Šubić.
- May 2 – Pope Clement V orders the confiscation of all property of the Knights Templar in the papal bull Ad providam.
- May 4 – Edward II and Piers Gaveston are at Newcastle upon Tyne when they are alerted to the news of an English force under Henry Percy and Robert Clifford is heading for them. They manage to escape to Scarborough Castle.
- May 6 – The Council of Vienne (convened in the southeastern French town of Vienne, in the modern-day département of Isère) is closed by Pope Clement V almost seven months after opening on October 16. During its session, the Knights Templar organization was outlawed, the matter of a posthumous trial against the late Pope Boniface VIII was tabled and forgotten about, and a pledge was made to raise tithes and offerings for a new crusade to someday be made against the Muslims. A medieval historian, John of Saint-Victor, writes later that "It was said by many that the council was created for the purpose of extorting money."
- May 13 – Frederick IV becomes the new Duke of Lorraine upon the death of his father, Theobald II.
- May 19 – Scarborough Castle is captured by English forces under the command of Aymer de Valence, 2nd Earl of Pembroke after a two week siege with the surrender of Piers Gaveston, after Aymer gives his word that Gaveston will not be harmed.
- May 28 – After the Emir Abu al-Juyush Nasr of Granada asks for help from King Ferdinand IV of Castile, the Kingdom of Castile's forces, commanded by Peter of Castile, Lord of Cameros, Ferdinand's son of King Sancho IV, defeats the rebel Granadan Governor of Malaga, Abu Said Faraj in battle. Abu Said is allowed to retain his post as Governor of Málaga and resumes paying tributes to the Emir.
- June 15 – Battle of Rozgony: Hungarian forces led by King Charles I defeat the family of Palatine Amadeus Aba near Rozgony. During the battle, Charles losses his royal standard, but is reinforced by German mercenaries from Košice (now part of the Republic of Slovakia). The rebel army is routed, and Charles extends his power base in Hungary. His position is secured and resistance (reduced by the magnates' opposition) against Charles' rule comes to an end.
- June 19 – One month after surrendering Scarborough Castle to the Earl of Pembroke and having his life spared, Piers Gaveston is executed at Blacklow Hill after having been taken hostage by Guy de Beauchamp, 10th Earl of Warwick and put in a dungeon at Warwick Castle.
- June 29 – Henry VII is crowned emperor of the Holy Roman Empire in the Lateran Palace, since St Peter's Basilica is occupied by Romans hostile to him.

==== July – September ====
- July 6 (1 Showa, 2nd day of 6th month) – Hirotoki Hojo becomes the regent for the Kamakura shogunate in Japan.
- July 8 – In Italy, Francesco I Pico, Lord of Mirandola, is captured at Baggiovara by Guelph rebels in Bologna, while on his way home to Mirandola after being invested by the Holy Roman Emperor, Henry VII as imperial vicar. Pico is imprisoned for the next nine months before being released to resume his Lordship.
- July 13
  - Giovanni Soranzo is elected as the new Doge to lead the Republic of Venice, 10 days after the death of the Doge Marino Zorzi and will serve for the next 18 years.
  - King Ferdinand IV of Castile leaves his palace at Ávila for the last time, placing his son Prince Alfonso in charge, and arrives in Toledo before proceeding to the province of Jaén to join his younger brother.
- August 27 – In France, Jean III, nicknamed "John the Good" becomes the new Duke of Brittany upon the death of his father, Arthur II.
- September 7 – King Ferdinand IV of Castile dies after a 17-year reign and is succeeded by his one-year-old son Alfonso XI. King Alfonso's mother, Queen consort Constance, becomes regent.
- September 27 – The Charter of Kortenberg is signed, and is possibly the first constitution which allows democratic decisions in feudal mainland Europe.

==== October – December ====
- October 13 – Özbeg Khan, the Mongol ruler of much of Russia, demands that the Middle East Mongol ruler Öljaitü cede to him the Azerbaijan territory of modern-day Iran.
- October 31 – Henry VII, Holy Roman Emperor abandons his campaign against Florence.
- November 9 – Otto III, Duke of Lower Bavaria and former King of Hungary, dies at his capital at Landshut (Niederbayern). Otto had shared power with his two brothers Louis III (who died in 1296) and Stephen I (who died in 1310), and the only heirs are the minor children of Stephen, 7-year-old Henry XIV and 5-year-old Otto IV, and Otto's 2-month-old son Henry XV, Duke of Bavaria.
- November 13 – Four years after the marriage of King Edward II of England and Queen consort Isabella, an heir to the throne is born at Windsor Castle, and will be christened four days later. Prince Edward. Upon the death of Edward II in 1327, his son will be crowned King Edward III at the age of 14.
- December 7 – Michael II, Syrian Orthodox patriarch of Antioch, dies after a service of 20 years. Michael III Yeshu will be elected his successor.
- December 13 – John Hotham is appointed as the new Chancellor of the Exchequer in England by King Edward and serves for three and a half years.
- December 15 – In Germany, Henry II the Lion, ruler of Mecklenburg, succeeds in his conquest of the Lordship of Rostock, at the time a protectorate of King Eric VI Menved of Denmark.
- December 23 – At Avignon in France, Pope Clement V elevates nine bishops, all French, to the position of Roman Catholic cardinals. The nine include Jacques d'Euse, Bishop of Avignon, who will be elected Pope John XXII as Clement's successor in 1316.

=== 1313 ===
==== January – March ====
- January 8 – King Robert the Bruce of Scotland recaptures Perth Castle from the English, then orders the walls and the building to be destroyed in order to prevent it from ever being used by the English again as a garrison.
- February 3 – William de Sancto Claro, the Bishop of Dunkeld and commonly known as William Sinclair, is issued a safe conduct pass by England's King Edward II in order to return to Scotland from Rome.
- February 7 – (12th waxing of Tabaung, 674 ME) In what is now the Mandalay Region of central Myanmar in Asia, Burmese King Thihathu proclaims the Pinya Kingdom, to separate the area from the Myinsaing Kingdom. Thihathu appoints his son, Kyawswa I of Pinya, to replace him as the Viceroy of Pinle in Myinsaing.
- March 28 – Francesco da Barberino of Tuscany receives a doctorate of both civil law and canonical law, by a bull issued by Pope Clement V.

==== April – June ====
- April 20 – The Duchy of Masovia in Poland is divided among the three sons of Boleslaw II upon his death, with Siemowit II creating the Duchy of Rawa (with a capital at Rawa Mazowiecka), Trojden receiving Czersk and Wenceslaus receiving Płock.
- April 22 – On the first Sunday after Easter, the French ship Ste Marie is shipwrecked on England's Isle of Wight at Chale Bay. Residents nearby loot the ship of its cargo, casks of wine belonging to Regimus de Depe of Aquitaine. As an act of penance, the Lord of Chale, Walder de Godeton, builds the St Catherine's Oratory.
- May 5 – Seventeen years after his death in prison in Ferentino, the later Pope Celestine V is canonized as a Roman Catholic saint.
- May 6 – In India, Veera Virupaksha Ballala, son and heir of Emperor Veera Ballala III of the Hoysala Empire, returns to the capital, Halebidu (now a ruins in the state of Karnataka), after two years as a hostage. Emperor Ballala III had agreed to leave his son behind at Delhi for two years as part of his surrender to the Delhi Sultan Alauddin Khalji.
- May 14 – In Poland, Bolko II of Opole and his brother Albert of Strzelce become the new rulers of Opole and Upper Silesia upon the death of their father, Bolko I.
- May 17 – Robert the Bruce, King of Scotland, leads an invasion of the Isle of Man, landing at Ramsey with a multitude of ships and captures it within five days. The only resistance is presented by the lord of Castle Rushen, and King Robert concentrates his efforts on a siege of the castle starting on May 22.
- May 28 – Thomas Cobham, Archdeacon of Lewes, is elected by his peers to be the Archbishop of Canterbury in England, but King Edward II intervenes and asks Pope Clement V to cancel the result. The Pope installs Walter Reynolds as the new archbishop on October 1.
- June 12 – Castle Rushen, on the Isle of Man, surrenders to Scotland's King Robert the Bruce after a siege of three weeks.
- June 13 – Pope Clement V declares Naples to be under papal protection. He names King Robert the Wise of Naples, "Senator of Rome".
- June 21 – In Germany, peace is made between Rudolf I, Duke of Bavaria, and his younger brother, Louis the Bavarian, with Rudolf having control of the Electoral Palatinate, in return for supporting the election of Louis as the next Holy Roman Emperor.
- June 24 – From the English garrison at Stirling Castle in Scottish territory, Sir Philip Mowbray proposes a truce with Edward Bruce, brother of King Robert the Bruce of Scotland, after a siege of "many months". Edward Bruce agrees to what Scottish historian Patrick Fraser Tytler will describe five centuries later as "a truce involving conditions which ought on no account to have been accepted." As Tytler notes, the effect "was to check the ardour of the Scots in that career of success, which was now rapidly leading to the complete deliverance of their country; it gave the King of England a whole year to assemble the strength of his dominions... We need not wonder, then, that Bruce was highly incensed, on hearing that, without consulting him, his brother had agreed to Mowbray's proposals."

==== July – September ====
- July 29 – In a complicated marital pact, Catherine of Valois–Courtenay, the Latin Empress of Constantinople, breaks her engagement to Hugh V, Duke of Burgundy, styled the King of Thessalonica in order to marry Philip I, Prince of Taranto, styled the King of Albania and Lord of Achaea. In exchange for Hugh's forbearance, Catherine cedes her lands to Hugh's sister, Joan the Lame, wife of Catherine's half-brother Philip of Valois, and Hugh becomes engaged to Joan of France. On the same day as Philip's marriage to Catherine, former fiancée of Hugh, Hugh's brother Louis of Burgundy marries Matilda of Hainaut (who had broken off her engagement to Philip of Taranto's son Charles of Taranto) and Philip of Taranto cedes the Principality of Achaea to Hugh and Matilda.
- August 8 – Emperor Henry VII begins a campaign against King Robert of Naples ("Robert the Wise"). Henry's allies are loath to join him and his 15,000-man army, supported by 4,000 knights, while the imperial fleet is prepared to attack King Robert's realm directly.
- August 9 – In the town of Horsens in Denmark, Eric of Jutland reaches a settlement with King Eric VI Menved and receives the Duchy of Schleswig in return for renouncing all claims to Langeland.
- August 24 – A week after contracting malaria during the siege of the Tuscan city of Siena, the Holy Roman Emperor Henry VII dies of malaria at Buonconvento. His 17-year-old son, John of Bohemia, will succeed him and will become one of the seven prince-electors of the Holy Roman Empire. Upon learning of the Henry's death, Louis, Duke of Bavaria goes to war against his cousin, Frederick the Fair, Duke of Austria and Styria, as both compete to be elected the new Emperor, a competition which will eventually be resolved in favour of Louis.
- September 23 – The English Parliament is called into session for the fourth time in less than 12 months, after three unsuccessful attempts to assemble members. King Edward II persuades the session to pass a tax bill for revenues to be collected by the following June in order to finance a new campaign against Scotland.

==== October – December ====
- October 21 – Robert the Bruce, King of Scotland delivers an ultimatum at a meeting of the Scottish nobles at an assembly in Dundee, giving Scots who have not yet come into his peace agreement a year to swear fealty to him or lose all their estates. The Scottish nobles of Lothian appeal to Edward II for protection, who promises to bring an English expeditionary force by midsummer in 1314.
- November 9 – Battle of Gammelsdorf: German forces led by Louis IV the Bavarian" defeat his cousin Frederick the Fair, at Gammelsdorf, who is supported by Leopold I the Glorious, Duke of Austria. During the battle, Louis' smaller force does not pursue Frederick's defeated army. He is forced to renounce his tutelage over the young dukes of Lower Bavaria (Henry XIV, Otto IV and Henry XV). The conflict causes a stir within the Holy Roman Empire.
- November 18 – Queen Constance of Portugal, mother of the 2-year-old King Alfonso XI dies. Alfonso's grandmother Queen dowager María de Molina, his uncle Peter of Castile, and his great-uncle John of Castile divide the regency over the young Alfonso. While Maria takes charge of his education, the infantes, especially Peter, assume the duty of defending Castile.
- December 26 – Three days after receiving authorization from the English Parliament for a feudal levy, King Edward II issues a summons for eight earls and 87 barons to muster their troops at Berwick-upon-Tweed by June 10 for an invasion of Scotland.

==== By place ====
====== Asia ======
- Tran Anh Tong, emperor of Annam (Northern Vietnam), occupies Champa (Southern Vietnam) and establishes the Cham royal dynasty as puppet rulers.

==== By topic ====
====== Literature ======
- Wang Zhen, Chinese agronomist, government official and inventor of wooden-based movable type printing, publishes the Nong Shu ("Book of Agriculture").

====== Religion ======
- King Stefan Milutin, one of the most powerful rulers of Serbia, founds the Banjska Monastery (approximate date).

=== 1314 ===
==== January – March ====
- January 17 – Queen Oljath, who had been the Queen consort of the Kingdom of Georgia as wife of King Vakhtang II (d. 1292), and then his cousin, King David VIII (d. 1302), marries a third time, taking as her husband Qara Sonqur, Governor of Maragheh (in the modern-day East Azerbaijan province of Iran), in exchange for a dowry of 30,000 dinars.
- January 21 (3 Shawwal 713 AH) – Muhammad III of Granada, Sultan from 1302 to 1309, is murdered by being drowned in the pool of the Dar al-Kubra on orders of his brother, Sultan Nasr.
- February 8 (21 Shawwal 713 AH) – Sultan Nasr of Granada is forced to abdicate after 18 days as the ruler of the Emirate of Granada (in modern-day Spain) by his nephew, Abu'l-Walid Ismail I ibn Faraj, who is proclaimed at the Alhambra as the new Sultan.
- March 18 – Jacques de Molay, Grand Master of the Knights Templar and Geoffroi de Charney, are, by orders of King Philip IV of France ("Philip the Fair"), burned at the stake in front of the cathedral of Notre-Dame de Paris on the Île de la Cité in the Seine. Jacques declares his innocence and that the Templar Order is also innocent of all the charges of heresy. It is said that Jacques correctly predicts the deaths of both Philip and Pope Clement V within the year.
- March – Tour de Nesle Affair: After confirmation that two of his sons' wives are engaged in adultery, King Philip IV of France orders the arrest of his daughters-in-law, Margaret of Burgundy (the wife of Prince Louis X); Blanche of Burgundy (wife of Prince Charles of Valois), and Joan II, Countess of Burgundy (wife of Prince Philip V). The arrests come after the accusations of King Philip's daughter, Isabella, Queen consort of England, and surveillance of the Tower of Nesle. Joan II is charged with being an accessory for being aware of the crime and not reporting it, and put under house arrest until after King Philip's death later in the year. Blanche is imprisoned at the Château Gaillard until 1322. Margaret will die of illness in prison a year later, and five months after technically becoming Queen consort of France. Two knights, Philip of Aunay and his older brother Walter of Aunay, are also arrested for adultery (with Margaret and Blanche respectively), imprisoned, tortured at the Place du Grand Martroy in Pontoise and brutally executed on April 19.

==== April – June ====
- April 4 – Exeter College, Oxford, in England is founded by Walter Stapledon, Bishop of Exeter, and his brother for the education of clergy.
- April 20 – Pope Clement V dies after an 9-year pontificate at Roquemaure. During his reign, he has reorganized and centralized the administration of the Catholic Church.
- May 1 – The 1314–1316 papal conclave to elect a successor to Pope Clement V begins at Carpentras Cathedral in Provence with 23 cardinals in attendance, of whom the votes of 16 are necessary to elect a new Pontiff. The cardinals are divided into three factions, none of which have more than eight people, with a group from Italy (led by Guillaume de Mandagot), who want to move the papacy back to Rome; nine from Gascony, most of whom are relatives of Pope Clement (led by Arnaud de Pellegrue); and five from Provence (led by Berengar Fredol).
- May 14 – In Italy, more than 50 of the Fraticelli spiritualists of the Franciscan order of Tuscany are excommunicated from the Roman Catholic Church by the Archbishop of Genoa after refusing to return to obedience to the Pope.
- June 17 – First War of Scottish Independence: English forces led by King Edward II leave Berwick-upon-Tweed to march to break the Scottish siege of Stirling Castle. They cross the River Tweed at Wark and Coldstream and march west across the flat Merse of Berwickshire towards Lauderdale. In Earlston, Edward uses an old Roman road through the Lammermuir Hills, practical for the wheeled transport of a long supply train as well as the cavalry and infantry.
- June 19 – English forces march to the environs of Edinburgh; here Edward II waits for the wagon train of over 200 baggage and supply wagons – which straggle behind the long columns, to catch up. At the nearby port of Leith, English supply ships land stores for the army – who will be well rested before the 35-mile (56 km) march that will bring them to Stirling Castle, before the deadline of June 24.
- June 23 – Battle of Bannockburn begins: English forces approach the Scottish positions at Torwood, mounted troops under Gilbert de Clare are confronted by Scottish forces and repulsed. During the fierce fighting, Henry de Bohun is killed in a duel by King Robert the Bruce. Edward II and forward elements, mainly cavalry, encamp at Bannockburn near Stirling in central Scotland. The baggage train and the majority of the forces arrive in the evening.
- June 24 – Battle of Bannockburn (First War of Scottish Independence): Scottish forces (some 8,000 men) led by Robert the Bruce defeat the English army at Bannockburn, securing de facto independence for Scotland. During the battle, the Scottish pikemen formed in schiltrons (or phalanx) repulses the English cavalry (some 2,000 men). Edward II flees with his bodyguard (some 500 men), while panic spreads among the remaining forces, turning their defeat into a rout. Stirling Castle is surrendered to the Scots.
- June 25 – Edward II arrives at Dunbar Castle, and takes safely a ship to Bamburgh in Northumberland. His mounted escort takes the coastal route from Dunbar to Berwick.

==== July – September ====
- July 14 – The Italian cardinals participating in the papal conclave in France walk out after weeks of harassment by supporters of a French candidate for pope. The rest of the College of Cardinals disperse to Avignon, seat of the Papacy; Orange, in the modern-day département of Vaucluse, and Valence in the modern-day département of Drôme. The conclave will not meet again for two years, during which time there is no Pope.
- August 14 – Scottish raiders led by Edward Bruce plunder the north-eastern counties of England in the Pennines; they are attacked at Stainmore by the English under Andrew Harclay.
- August 31 – King Haakon V of Norway moves his capital from Bergen to Oslo – where he builds Akershus Fortress, from which Norway is ruled for the next 500 years.
- September 29 – In exchange for captured English nobles, Edward II releases Elizabeth de Burgh, wife of Robert the Bruce, his sister Mary Bruce, and his daughter Marjorie Bruce.

==== October – December ====
- October 19 – 19 October 1314 imperial election for the Holy Roman Emperor at Sachsenhausen (Frankfurt am Main). The 25-year-old Frederick the Fair of the House of Habsburg is elected by four of the electors and is crowned at Bonn Minster on November 25; however, in a dispute over validity of the election, Louis IV the Bavarian of the House of Wittelsbach is elected the following day by the remaining three electors and is crowned at Aachen, leading to civil war in the Empire.
- November 29 – Louis X ("Louis the Quarrelsome") becomes King of France after his father, King Philip IV, is killed in a hunting accident at Fontainebleau.
- December 3 – The state funeral and burial of King Philip IV takes place at the Basilica of Saint-Denis near Paris.
- December 9 – Brandenburg–Pomeranian conflict: In Germany, the Margraviate of Brandenburg renounces all claims to the region around Loitz (in the modern-day northeast German state of Mecklenburg-Vorpommern) to the Principality of Rügen in Denmark in return for payment.

==== Undated ====
- Stephen II becomes ruler (ban) of Bosnia following the death of his father Stephen I Kotromanić. He rules the lands from the river Sava to the Adriatic Sea, but does not effectively come into full power until 1322.
- Amda Seyon I, known as "the Pillar of Zion" begins his reign as Emperor of Ethiopia, during which he expands into Muslim territory to the southeast by incorporating a number of smaller states.

==== By topic ====
====== Religion ======
- The Ozbek Han Mosque is built in the realm of Özbeg Khan in the Crimea.
- Completion of Old St Paul's Cathedral in London.

====== Natural environment ======
- Approximate date – Volcanic eruption of Mount Tarawera in New Zealand; there are few settlers here at this time.

=== 1315 ===
==== January – March ====
- January 2 – King Edward II of England buries his friend, the late Piers Gaveston, having secured a papal absolution in one of the last acts of Pope Clement V. The burial takes place somewhere near the King's Langley Priory in Hertfordshire, but the location of the tomb is subsequently forgotten. Gaveston had been excommunicated before he had been executed.
- January 20 – The English Parliament is convened at Lincoln to hear the reading of the Articuli Cleri, the list of grievances against the church in England. The parliament ends on March 9.
- February 12 – Italian sculptor Tino di Camaino is commissioned by the Republic of Pisa to create the statue of the late Henry VII, Holy Roman Emperor (Enrico VII di Lussemburgo, King of Italy), to be finished in less than six months for the August 24 dedication of Henry's tomb. Camaino delivers the work by July 26.
- February 15 – John of Argyll reports to King Edward II of England that he and his army have recovered the Isle of Man and expelled the Scottish occupiers.
- March 4 (4 Dhu al-Hijjah 714 AH) – The Emir of Mecca, Abu al-Ghayth, is defeated in a battle near Mecca by his brother Humaydah ibn Abi Numayy. Wounded in battle, then captured by the enemy, Abu al-Ghayth is executed by order of his brother at Khayf Bani Shadid.
- March 8 – The Al-Shamah Mosque, in modern-day Gaza City in Palestine, is completed after being commissioned by the Mamluk Sultanate Governor of Gaza, Sanjar al-Jawli.
- March 27 – In China, Kunga Lotro Gyaltsen is installed as the Imperial Preceptor of Tibetan Buddhists, by order of the Mongol Emperor Ayurbarwada Buyantu Khan.

==== April – June ====
- April 26 – The Scottish parliament is convened at Ayr, and proclaims Edward Bruce as the legal heir to the throne to succeed if Edward's brother, King Robert the Bruce dies.
- April 28 – The Mamluk Sultanate army invades the Christian outpost of Malatya in Byzantium, then loots the city.
- April 30
  - Margaret of Burgundy, technically Queen consort of France as the wife of King Louis X, dies in the Château Gaillard prison after a year of incarceration, due to her 1314 conviction for adultery in the Tour de Nesle affair. Unable to have the marriage nullified because a new Pope has not been installed, King Louis leaves Margaret imprisoned.
  - Enguerrand de Marigny, who had been the Chief Minister of France during the reign of King Philip IV of France, is hanged at the Gibbet of Montfaucon in Paris, on orders of Philip's successor, King Louis X.
- May 9 – In France, Odo IV becomes the new Duke of Burgundy upon the death of his older brother, Hugh V.
- May 26 – King Edward II of England and ships with more than 6,000 troops land on the coast of Ireland at Larne to counter the Scottish invasion of Ireland led by Edward Bruce.
- June 15 – King James II of Aragon is married by proxy to Marie of Lusignan, daughter of King Hugh III of Cyprus, at a ceremony attended by James's representative at Nicosia.

==== July – September ====
- July 3 – King Louis X abolishes serfdom in the Kingdom of France.
- July 6 – In Germany, Henry II, Lord of Mecklenburg is married to Anna of Saxe-Wittenberg , daughter of Albert II, Duke of Saxony. The marriage produces an heir, Albert II, who will become Duke of Mecklenburg in 1348.
- July 22 – Siege of Carlisle: Scottish forces led by King Robert the Bruce besiege Carlisle Castle, but the stronghold holds out, due to a well-conducted defense organized by Andrew Harclay and the siege is abandoned by August 1.
- July 24 – Otto II, Prince of Anhalt-Aschersleben, dies without leaving any heirs, bringing an end to the Principality. His assets are seized by his cousin and creditor, Bishop Albert of Halberstadt.
- July 28 – King Louis X of France issues a charter in allowing expelled Jews to come back to France, but under strict conditions. The French Jews will be allowed to stay in the country for 12 years, after which their right to remain will be reviewed. For identification, Jewish people are required to wear armbands in public, can only live in designated communities and are forbidden from usury. Through this, the Jewish community will depend upon the king for their right to protection. In December, Sultan Ismail I of Granada implements similar rules for the Jews in the Spanish kingdom, directing Jews to wear a yellow badge in public.
- July 31 – King Louis X mobilizes an army along the Flemish border. He prohibits the export of grain and other goods to Flanders – which proves challenging to enforce. Louis pressures officers of the Church at the borderlands, as well as King Edward II, to support his effort to prevent Spanish merchant vessels from trading with the embargoed Flemish cities.
- August 1 – After a 10-day siege of the Irish stronghold at Carlisle, King Robert of Scotland withdraws on August 1. During the Scots' presence in Cumbria, Scottish forces under James the Black raid Copeland and plunder St Bees Priory.
- August 11 (12th day of 7th month of 4 Shōwa) – Hōjō Mototoki becomes ruler (shogun) and regent (shikken) of the Kamakura shogunate in Japan upon the death of Hōjō Hirotoki.
- August 17 – Ferdinand of Majorca completes the conquest of the Principality of Achaea, one of the crusader states that had been founded in Greece during the Fourth Crusade, by capturing the capital, Andravida.
- August 19 – King Louis X of France, nicknamed "Louis the Quarrelsome", marries the 22-year-old Clementia of Hungary,daughter of Charles Martel of Anjou (titular king of Hungary). He and his second wife are five days later crowned at Reims. Louis becomes the 12th Capetian ruler of France. After his coronation, he passes the throne of the Kingdom of Navarre to his younger brother, who becomes Philip II of Navarre, nicknamed "Philip the Tall".
- August 24 – The coronation of Louis X as King of France takes place at Reims, nine months after Louis ascended the throne upon the death of his father, Philip IV.
- August 29 – Battle of Montecatini: The Pisan army (some 20,000 men) led by Uguccione della Faggiuola defeats the allied forces of Florence and Naples. During the battle, Philip I manages to escape, but his son Charles of Taranto (titled the Latin Emperor of Constantinople and his brother Peter Tempesta are killed.
- September 3 (3 Jumada II 715 AH) – Rumaythah ibn Abi Numayy, the former emir of Mecca, arrives at the court of the Mamluk Sultan of Egypt, al-Nasir Muhammad in Cairo. He receives pardon from the Sultan and seeks support against the new Emir, Humaydah ibn Abi Numayy, who had killed his brother and predecessor, Abu al-Ghayth. Al-Nasir sends Rumaythah back to Mecca with an Egyptian army. However, six days before the relief army's arrival, Humaydah pillages and burns the castle at Wadi Marr, and destroys 2,000 date palm trees.
- September 10 – The Battle of Connor is fought in County Antrim in Ireland (Northern Ireland) as part of the Bruce campaign in Ireland. Scottish-Irish forces commanded by Edward Bruce, brother of Scotland's King Robert the Bruce, routs the army commanded by "The Red Earl", Richard Óg de Burgh, 2nd Earl of Ulster. Those earls not captured by the Scottish army flee to Carrickfergus Castle

==== October – December ====
- October 9 – Banastre Rebellion: A group of English knights start an uprising in Lancashire and revenge themselves on Thomas of Lancaster. After the rebellion, Liverpool Castle is granted to Robert de Holland.
- November 15 – Battle of Morgarten: The Swiss defeat Leopold of Austria on the shore of the Ägerisee, ensuring independence for the Swiss Confederation.
- November 17 – The marriage of King James II of Aragon to Marie of Lusignan is performed in person after Marie has traveled to Spain, with the ceremony taking place at Girona.
- December 9 – In Switzerland, the Pact of Brunnen is signed between leaders of the cantons of Uri, Schwyz and Unterwalden at the city of Brunnen in Schwyz as a mutual defense pact against an invasion by Austria.
- December 13
  - Gaston II of Foix-Béarn becomes the new French representative to rule the Co-principality of Andorra after the death of his father, Gaston I.
  - (3 Jumada II 715 AH) Rumaythah ibn Abi Numayy arrives at Mecca with an Egyptian Army, led by the emirs Najm al-Din Damurkhan ibn Qaraman and Sayf al-Din Taydamur al-Jamadar, then spends two weeks in making plans to drive out the Emir Humaydah ibn Abi Numayy. They loot Humaydah's castle at al-Khalf wal-Khulayf, plunder the wealth inside and capture his 12-year-old son, but Humaydah himself escapes to Iraq.

=== 1316 ===
==== January – March ====
- January 4 – Sultan Alauddin Khalji of the Delhi Sultanate dies after a 19-year reign at Delhi. He is succeeded by his 5-year-old son, Shihabuddin Omar, with the support of Alauddin's general Malik Kafur. During his reign, a power struggle occurs between Malik Kafur and the Khalji family.
- January 28 – Llywelyn Bren leads a revolt against English rule in Wales. After disregarding an order to appear before King Edward II, Llywelyn Bren raises a rebel army and lays siege to Caerphilly Castle. The revolt spreads throughout the south Wear Cove (the Wales valley), and other castles are attacked. Edward sends an expeditionary force led by Humphrey de Bohun to suppress the rebellion. In March, after a battle at Morgraig Castle Llywelyn Bren is forced to break off the Caerphilly siege after six weeks and surrenders on March 18.
- February 8 – After only 35 days of ruling the Delhi Sultanate as regent, Malik Kafur is assassinated by Sultan Alauddin's former bodyguards.
- February 14 – Battle of Skaithmuir: Scottish forces under James Douglas, Lord of Douglas defeat an English raiding party near Coldstream. During the skirmish, Edmond de Caillou (nephew of Piers Gaveston) is killed.
- February 22 – Battle of Picotin: Catalan forces led by Prince Ferdinand of Majorca, claimant to the Principality of Achaea, defeat the army of Princess Matilda of Hainaut, on the Peloponnese. During the battle, the Catalans kill 500 Burgundians and 700 native troops. The remnants of the Princess's army withdraw in haste, pursued by the Catalan cavalry; before they turn back to loot the abandoned Achaean camp.
- March 12 – At Belgrade, Stefan Vladislav II becomes the new King of Syrmia (now part of Serbia) upon the death of his father, Stefan Dragutin.
- March 18 – After leading a six-week-long revolt from Wales against England's , and retreating to Glamorgan, Welsh rebel Llywelyn Bren finally surrenders to King Edward's general, Humphrey de Bohun at Ystradfellte.

==== April – June ====
- April 14 – Qutb al-Din Mubarak, the 17-year-old son of Alauddin Khalji, succeeds him and ascends the throne as ruler of the Delhi Sultanate.
- May 2 – In an attempt to stir the Irish nobles into rebellion against English rule, Edward Bruce, brother of King Robert the Bruce of Scotland is crowned High King of Ireland.
- June 5 – King Louis X of France ("Louis the Quarrelsome") dies, possibly from poisoning, during a game of tennis at Vincennes, leaving his pregnant wife Clementia of Hungary as his widow. Following Louis' death, his 23-year-old brother Philip is made regent for the remainder of Clementia's pregnancy. There are several potential candidates for the role of regent, his uncle Charles, Count of Valois and Odo IV, Duke of Burgundy.

==== July – September ====
- July 5 – Battle of Manolada: Latin forces under Louis of Burgundy, supported by Byzantine troops sent by governor Michael Kantakouzenos, defeat the Catalan army under Ferdinand of Majorca. During the battle, Ferdinand is killed and John II of Nivelet, who claims the Principality of Achaea is executed on the field as a traitor. His lands are given to Louis' Burgundian followers. Louis of Burgundy and his wife, Matilda of Hainaut, become the joint rulers of Achaea.
- July 29 – 10th day of 7th month of 5 Shōwa; In Japan, Hōjō Takatoki becomes the 14th regent of the Kamakura shogunate.
- August 2 – Matilda of Hainaut becomes the sole leader of the Principality of Achaea, after her husband, Prince Louis of Burgundy, dies of poisoning one month after having secured his position during the Battle of Mandolada.
- August 5 – Battle of Gransee: A North German-Danish alliance, led by Henry II, Lord of Mecklenburg ("Henry the Lion"), decisively defeats the forces under Waldemar the Great at Schulzendorf. During the battle, Waldemar escapes the battlefield, but his army – which consists largely of knights in armor — is massacred. Later, the victorious alliance negotiates a peace treaty at Zehdenick.
- August 7 – After an interregnum (sede vacante) of two years, due to disagreements between the cardinals, French cardinal Jacques Duèze, Bishop of Avignon, is elected as successor to Pope Clement V, who died in 1314.
- August 10 – Second Battle of Athenry: Norman rule is retained during the Bruce campaign in Ireland, at the cost of over 5,000 dead.
- August 17 – Brothers Albert II and Waldemar I become the joint rulers of the Principality of Anhalt-Zerbst in Germany upon the death of their father, Prince Albert I.
- September 5 – The coronation of Jacques Deuze as Pope John XXII takes place at Avignon in France, as he becomes the 196th pontiff of the Roman Catholic Church. His papacy will last until 1334.

==== October – December ====
- October 1 – Birger, King of Sweden, issues a letter of protection to the women of the Karelian people in Finland, at the time a part of the Kingdom of Sweden. The letter is the oldest document in the National Archives of Sweden.
- October 30 – A papal court in Avignon, with Cardinal Berengar Fredol the Elder presiding, rules that Juan Fernández was properly elected Bishop of León (now in Spain), dismissing a challenge by Juan García. Fernández had been elected a year before, but his confirmation by the Pope was delayed because of the challenge. Before Fernández can travel to Avignon, however, he passes away on December 17.
- November 16 – John of the House of Capet is born four months after the death of his father, King Louis X of France and, as the eldest (and only) son of King Louis, becomes King John I of France from the moment of his birth, with his uncle, Prince Philip the Tall, serving as regent. John dies, four days after his birth, on November 20.
- November 20 – Upon the death of the infant John I, Philip the Tall, eldest surviving brother of King Louis X of France, becomes King Philip V
- December 16 – Abu Sa'id Bahadur Khan becomes the new Mongol Ikhanate of the Middle East upon the death of his father, the Ikhan Öljaitü.

==== By place ====
====== England ======
- The Pound sterling experiences the greatest year of inflation in its history, at 100.04 percent, losing over half its value.

=== 1317 ===
==== January – March ====
- January 9 – The 23-year-old Philip the Tall, younger brother of the late King Louis X of France, is hastily crowned King of France, as King Philip V, at Rheims. The only son of King Louis X had been born posthumously, but died after four days. Supporters of King Louis felt that his eldest daughter, Joan II of Navarre, should have been crowned as the monarch. Mass protests follow in Artois, Champagne and Burgundy. The coronation of a brother, instead of the eldest daughter, as the successor to the throne sets the precedent for the Salic law, providing that the eldest male heir inherits the throne. Philip V reorganizes the French army by extending the military obligations of the realm. Each town and castellany is responsible for providing a specified number of fully equipped troops – such as sergeants and infantry militias, while towns in economically advanced areas like Flanders become a major source of men and money. At the same time, the arriére ban (military recruitment) is generally commuted in favour for taxation.
- February 1 – Manuel Pessanha of Genoa is appointed as the first Chief Admiral of Portugal (Almirante-mor) by King Denis, and charged with organizing a permanent navy for the kingdom, with 20 warships and hiring Genoese captains to recruit sailors. The organization of the Portuguese Royal Navy is completed by December 12.
- February 16 – (10th day of 1st month of 6 Shōwa) An earthquake of estimated 7.0 magnitude strikes Kyoto. On February 22, an aftershock of 6.0 magnitude follows the first quake.
- March 15 – Pope John XXII admonishes King Frederick III of Sicily to take severe measures against the Fraticelli, the Spiritual Franciscans who have broken with the Roman Catholic Church doctrine.
- March 17 – In Germany, Waldemar the Great becomes the sole ruler of the reunited Margraviate of Brandenburg upon the death of his cousin, John V, Margrave of Brandenburg-Salzwedel. Waldemar had been the Margrave of Brandenburg-Stendal since 1308.
- March 23 – In France, Hugues Géraud, the Roman Catholic Bishop of Cahors, is arrested along with plotting to assassinate Pope John XXII (with poisoned bread) and to use evil magic against him and two of his advisors, Bertrand du Pouget and Gaucelme de Jean. Following a trial, Géraud is convicted of witchcraft and sacrilege, and executed on August 30.
- March 31 – Pope John XXII claims imperial rights of government in Italy for the papacy. He erects the dioceses of Luçon, Maillezais, and Tulle and issues the decretal Spondent Pariter prohibiting alchemy.

==== April – June ====
- April 7 – Louis of Toulouse is canonized as a saint in the Roman Catholic Church by Pope John XXII.
- April 11 – In Italy's Republic of Massa, coinage is resumed by arrangement of the Republic and of the Benzi family.
- April 27 – John XXII orders the Spiritual Franciscans, including the French priest Bernard Délicieux, to come to Avignon and answer for their disobedience. Upon arrival, Délicieux is arrested and interrogated.
- May 13 – King Edward II restores the dower lands that had been surrendered by Margaret de Clare, widow of Piers Gaveston.
- May 22 – Pursuant to the papal order of April 27, the first of the Spiritual Franciscans (Fraticelli) appear before Pope John XXII to be confronted over their disobedience.
- June 13 – Cardinal Jacques de Via, Bishop of Avignon and nephew of Pope John XXII, is found dead. A court will conclude on August 30 that de Via was murdered by witchcraft.
- June 23 – Thawun Gyi, Burmese monarch of the principality of Toungoo, is assassinated by his younger brother, Thawun Nge, who takes his place.

==== July – September ====
- July 5 – Mongol Prince Abu Sa'id Bahadur Khan becomes the ruler of the Ilkhanate, the Mongol-controlled area of the Middle East.
- July 22 – Alexander de Bicknor is consecrated by the Pope as the Archbishop of Dublin.
- August 21 – Hugues Géraud, the Catholic Bishop of Cahors who is implicated in a plot to assassinate Pope John XXII, is personally questioned by the Pope. Géraud is convicted on August 30 of witchcraft, sacrilege and the June 13 murder of Cardinal Jacques de Via, and is burned at the stake as punishment.
- September 1 – Near Rushyford in County Durham, English knight Gilbert Middleton begins a rebellion against King Edward II. Middleton attacks and takes hostage the newly elected Bishop of Durham, Louis de Beaumont, Louis' brother Henry de Beaumont, and two cardinals, Gauscelin de Jean and Luca Fieschi. The cardinals are set free, while the Beaumonts are imprisoned at Mitford Castle for the next seven weeks.

==== October – December ====
- October 7 – Pope John XXII issues the bull Quorundam exigit, imposing a more lenient treatment of supporters of the Franciscan cause of "unconditional poverty".
- October 17 – Sir Gilbert Middleton releases the Bishop of Durham, Louis de Beaumont, and the bishop's brother Henry after being paid a ransom of 500 marks (2,000 troy ounces) of silver.
- November 9 – William II, son of King Frederick III of Sicily, becomes the new Duke of Athens upon the death of his older brother, Manfred of Sicily.
- November 13 – Yahballaha III, Patriarch of the Church of the East in Byzantium, dies after serving 26 years as leader of the Eastern Orthodox Church. Timothy II of Seleucia-Ctesiphon will be elected to succeed him.
- November 25 – Treaty of Templin: After ending the war between the Margraviate of Brandenburg and Denmark, Brandenburg is forced to negotiate a truce. King Eric VI, his ally Duke Henry the Lion and Waldemar the Great sign a peace treaty in Templin. Brandenburg agrees to transfer Burg Stargard and Arnsberg castle to Mecklenburg. They also surrender the territories of Schlawe-Stolp, located on the Baltic coast, to Pomerania.
- December 11 – King Birger Magnusson has his brothers, Dukes Eric Magnusson and Valdemar Magnusson, captured and thrown into a dungeon during the Nyköping Banquet – as a revenge for their imprisonment of him in the Håtuna games (see 1306). As the brothers soon starve to death in the dungeon, their followers rebel against Birger, throwing Sweden into civil war.
- December 12 – The Portuguese Royal Navy, with 20 warships, is created by order of King Denis. The Navy has 20 armed galleys as warships, under the command of Admiral Manuel Pessanha and will celebrate its 700th anniversary in 2017 as the oldest continuously serving navy in the world.

==== Date unknown ====
- A Hungarian document mentions for the first time Basarab I as leader of Wallachia (historians estimate he was on the throne since about 1310). Basarab will become the first voivode of Wallachia as an independent state, and founder of the House of Basarab (until 1352).
- The Great Famine of 1315–1317 comes to an end. Crop harvests return to normal – but it will be another five years before food supplies are completely replenished in Northern Europe. Simultaneously, the people are so weakened by diseases such as pneumonia, bronchitis, and tuberculosis. Historians debate the toll, but it is estimated that 10–25% of the population of many cities and towns dies.

=== 1318 ===
==== January – March ====
- January 23 – Pope John XXII issues the papal bull Gloriosam ecclesiam, excommunicating the Fraticelli, or Spiritual Franciscans from the Roman Catholic Church. The group is known for pursuing strictly the Franciscan ideal of Apostolic poverty and attempting to force others to do so. The Pope cites as reasons for the excommunication that the adherents are guilty of making accusations of corruption, against the Church, denial of the authority of priests, refusal to take oaths to the church, teaching that priests could not confer sacraments, and claiming to be the only group to be true observers of the Gospel.
- January 26 – Sir Gilbert Middleton, an English knight who had rebelled against King Edward II and kidnapped the Bishop of Durham on September 1, is convicted of treason and then executed by being hanged, drawn and quartered.
- February 12 – In Italy, Cangrande I della Scala, Lord of Verona successfully takes Padua. Led by Jacopo I da Carrara, the Paduan Greater Council agrees to cede the territories of Monselice, Este, Castelbaldo and Montagnana to Cangrande for life.
- February 14 – In Germany, Henry II becomes the new Margrave of Brandenburg-Stendal upon the death of his father Henry Lackland.
- March 27 – King Philip of France and Navarre reaches an agreement with the Capetian House of Burgundy to settle dissatisfaction over his claim of the crown as the brother of the late Louis X, ahead of Joan of Burgundy, the 4-year-old daughter of Louis X. King Philip agrees that Joan will arrange for Joan to eventually become the Queen of Navarre.
- March 29 – (Bunpō 2, 26th day of 2nd month) Japan's Emperor Hanazono abdicates the throne after a 9-year reign. He is succeeded by his cousin, Go-Daigo, who will rule until 1339).

==== April – June ====
- April 1
  - Pope John XXII creates the Archdiocese of Soltaniyeh (now located in northwestern Iran), bringing the Roman Catholic hierarchy to the Ilkhanate in Persia, with the Dominican missionary Francesco da Perugia (Francon de Perouse) as the first Archbishop. Francesco and six bishops arrive on August 1.
  - After the appointment of Guglielmo di Balaeto as rector by Pope John XXII with broad powers before the city of Benevento, the inhabitants rise against the Pope and demand some political autonomy. Finally, the rebellion is crushed by papal forces.
- April 2 – After a two-day battle, Scottish forces under James the Black retake Berwick-upon-Tweed. The fall of Berwick is a severe blow for King Edward II, and its loss is compounded by the fall of the Northumbrian castles of Wark-on-Tweed (Carham Castle), Harbottle and Mitford.
- April 16 – An agreement with Birger, King of Sweden is made to release his two brothers Valdemar, Duke of Finland and Eric Magnusson, Duke of Södermanland, who had been imprisoned at Nyköping Castle since December 10. The treaty is brokered by Valdemar's wife Ingeborg Eriksdottir of Norway and Eric's wife, Princess Ingeborg of Norway, who pledge for Valdemar and Eric to renounce all claims to the Swedish throne. However, Valdemar and Eric have already died inside the prison, and the discovery leads to a rebellion against King Birger.
- April 30 – The coronation ceremony of Go-Daigo as Emperor of Japan is held.
- May 7 – At the marketplace in the French city of Marseille, four of the most defiant members of the Fraticelli (or Spiritual Franciscans) are found guilty of heresy and burned at the stake.
- May 10 – Battle of Dysert O'Dea: An Irish confederation defeats the Hiberno-Normans under Richard de Clare. During the battle, some 500 men are killed, along with 80 English nobles.
- May – Having captured Berwick-upon-Tweed, Scottish forces under King Robert the Bruce raid Yorkshire and burn Northallerton, Boroughbridge and Knaresborough (where some 140 houses are destroyed). They also terrorize the citizens of Ripon, who are spared destruction, on payment of 1,000 marks.
- June 11 – John Hotham is appointed as the Lord Chancellor of England, the highest ranking office for a member of parliament, by King Edward II.
- June 12 – Russians destroy areas of Finland and burn Kuusisto castle in 1318. They rob Turku on the 12th of June.
- June 13 – Robert, King of Naples delivers an ultimatum to Matilda of Hainaut, ruler of the Greek Principality of Achaea, to accept marriage to John of Gravina or to lose her right to rule.
- June 18 – The arranged marriage of 6-year-old Joan of Burgundy and 12-year-old Philip of Navarre is held as part of a contract for Joan and Philip to eventually become the co-monarchs of Navarre. The two will succeed to the monarchy in 1328.
- June 27 – The reign of King Birger of Sweden ends as supporters of his late brothers, Valdemar and Eric, storm the Nyköping Castle. Birger and his wife flee to Stegeborg Castle, then flee again when the rebels capture the stronghold in August.

==== July – September ====
- July 13 – Rashid al-Din Hamadani, the Grand Vizier of the Ilkhanate in Iran during the reign of the Mongol Ilkhan Öljaitü, is convicted of the 1316 murder of the Ilkhan, and is executed (along with his son Ibrahim Izzaddin).
- July 22 – (22 Jumada I 718) In what is now northwestern Algeria, Abu Tashufin I assassinates his father, Abu Hammu I, Sultan of Tlemcen, and becomes the new monarch.
- July 25 – In Italy, Jacopo I da Carrara becomes the first Lord of Padua, founding the Carraresi dynasty that will rule the independent city state for almost 90 years before its conquest and annexation by the Republic of Venice following a war in 1405.
- August 9 – Treaty of Leake: Edward II signs an agreement with the "Middle Party" led by his cousin, Earl Thomas of Lancaster, and his court followers at East Leake in Nottinghamshire.
- September 13 – Pope John XXII appoints a commission of three members (Uberto d'Ormont, Bishop of Naples; Angelo Tignosi, Bishop of Viterbo; and notary Pandulpho de Sabbello) to take evidence on the matter of the canonization of Thomas Aquinas. Testimony is taken of 42 witnesses between July 21 and September 18, 1319.
- September 22 – Otto the Mild, becomes ruler over the Duchy of Brunswick-Lüneburg in Lower Saxony, after the death of his father Albert the Fat

==== October – December ====
- October 14 – Battle of Faughart: A Hibernian and Norman force defeats a Scotch-Irish army commanded by Edward Bruce, who had proclaimed himself High King of Ireland. Edward Bruce is killed in the battle, ending the Bruce campaign in Ireland.
- November 22 – Grand Prince Mikhail of Tver is summoned by Özbeg Khan at Sarai, the capital of the Golden Horde. After his arrival, he is executed.
- December 3 – The Parliament of Scotland meets at Scone and votes to designate Robert Stewart, grandson of King Robert the Bruce as the heir presumptive. Robert Stewart is the son of Robert the Bruce's late daughter Marjorie Bruce and of Walter Stewart. On the birth of David as Robert the Bruce's son in 1324, Robert Stewart will become second in line for the throne, eventually becoming King Robert II in 1371.

=== 1319 ===
==== January – March ====
- January 14 – The Earl of Pembroke and the Earl of Hereford persuade Walter Reynolds, Archbishop of Canterbury, to consecrate Stephen Gravesend as the Bishop of London.
- January 20 – A convocation at York is held by order of the Archbishop, William Melton, after orders sent by him to the Bishops of Durham and of Carlisle on November 28, 1318 to bring all abbots, priors, archdeacons and convents in their jurisdiction to appear before him "in octabis Sancti Hilarii proxime futuris" (on the next octave of Saint Hillary).
- February 6 – (14 Dhu al-Hijjah 718 AH) Rumaythah ibn Abi Numayy and Sayf al-Din Bahadur al-Ibrahimi, both former Emirs of Mecca, are arrested by the incumbent Emir, Shams al-Din Aq Sunqur al-Nasiri and taken from Mecca to Cairo for imprisonment. Rumaythah is charged with having provided support to his brother, Humaydah ibn Abi Numayy and al-Ibrahimi is accused of allowing Humaydah to escape. Rumaythah is pardoned a month later after arriving in Cairo.
- March 14 – The Military Order of Christ (Ordem Militar de Cristo) is established in Portugal by King Denis of Portugal after Pope John XXII issues the papal bull Ad ea ex quibus. The new Order is the revival of former Knights Templar who had aided the Kingdom of Portugal in its post-war reconstruction.

==== April – June ====
- April 19 – Philip I, Prince of Taranto, in his capacity as King of Albania, gives the title of Philip, Despot of Romania to his second eldest son Prince Philip II. Despite the mention of Romania, the despotate is a part of Albania, and the title gives rights of Philip II to Epirus in Greece.
- May 8 – King Haakon V Magnusson of Norway dies at the age of 49 with no sons, leaving the throne empty until the nobles can agree on his successor. Havtore Jonsson manages a guardianship government until the nobles choose Magnus VII Eriksson, son of Haakon's daughter Ingeborg.
- June 20 – Within the Mongol Empire, Özbeg Khan of the Golden Horde (the Mongol-controlled area of what is now Uzbekistan and Russia) fights a battle against the Ilkhanate (the Mongol-controlled Middle East) in an attempt to expand the Golden Horde's territory, with a confrontation in Ilkhanate territory at Mianeh (now in Iran). The troops of Özbeg Khan are supplemented with rebels led by an Ilkhanate prince, Yasa'ur. The Ilkhan Sultan, Abu Sa'id Bahadur Khan and his general, Amir Chupan, lead the defenders to victory and take many of the rebel officers prisoner. Afterward, 36 emirs and seven viceroys are executed for treason, including Qurumushi of Georgia and Irinjin of Anatolia.
- June 25 – Battle of the Vega of Granada: Castilian forces of 12,000 troops, led by the regents Don Pedro of Castile and Don Juan of Castile are defeated by a Moorish relief army at Granada during their attempt . Both regents are killed in the fighting. Pedro and Juan had summoned their Catilian vassals to assemble an expeditionary army in Córdoba, as part of an attempt to restore the deposed Sultan Nasr to the Granadan throne.

==== July – September ====
- July 8 – Magnus Eriksson is elected King of Sweden. His mother Ingeborg of Norway is given a place in the regency.
- July 21 – Canonization of Thomas Aquinas: The taking of testimony from more than 40 witnesses is started by Bishop Uberto d'Ormont of Naples, Bishop Angelo Tignosi of Viterbo, and notary Pandulpho de Sabbello, and will continue until September 18.
- July 23 – Battle of Chios: A Knights Hospitaller-Genoese fleet (some 30 ships) led by Albert of Schwarzburg defeats a Turkish fleet, off Chios.
- August 12 – The Duchy of Bavaria, split between two brothers since 1294, is reunited upon the death of Rudolf the Stammerer, Duke of Upper Bavaria. Ludwig the Barbarian, King of the Romans and Duke of Lower Bavaria. In 1328, Ludwig will later be elected the Holy Roman Emperor as Louis IV.
- August 14 – At the age of 11, Henry the Child becomes the Margrave of Brandenburg in Germany upon the death of his first cousin and guardian, Waldemar the Great. Because of Henry's age, the Duke of Pomerania, Wartislaw IV controls as Brandenburg as regent. Upon Henry II's death 11 months later, the House of Ascania's dynasty over Brandenburg will come to an end.
- August – Magnus Eriksson, grandson of the recently-deceased King Haakon V and already proclaimed King of Sweden, is recognized by the Norwegian assembly as King Magnus VII of Norway, thus establishing a personal union with Sweden and Norway.
- September 6 – As a reward for his victory at the Battle of Mianeh, General Chupan of the Ilkhanate is allowed to marry Sati Beg, the sister of the Ilkhanate Sultan Abu Sa'id.
- September 13 – Pope John XXII issues the papal bull "Imminente Nobis", declaring that the Pope has the right of appointment to all clerical offices (archbishops, bishops, abbots, priors and collegiate and monasterial leaders) in the Roman Catholic Church, ending the right of the individual chapters to elect their own leaders.
- September 20 – Battle of Myton: Scottish forces (some 15,000 men) led by James the Black, Lord Douglas, defeat an English army in an encounter known as the "Chapter of Myton" because of the large number of clergymen involved. David Dalrymple, Lord Hailes, writes 460 years later, "The English were instantly routed. Three thousand were left dead on the field, and great part of fugitives drowned in the Swale. In this action there fell three thousand ecclesiastics, [20th September.] According to the savage peasantry of those times, this rout was termed by the Scots, the Chapter of Mitton." After the battle, King Edward II is forced to raise the siege at Berwick Castle and retreats south of the River Trent, allowing the Scots to ravage Cumberland and Westmorland unmolested. Queen Isabella, who is in York at this time, manages to escape to safety at Nottingham.

==== October – December ====
- October 17 – Prince Jaime of Aragon marries the 12-year-old Princess Leonor of Castile at Gandesa, but announces at the conclusion of the mass that "his decision was to never rule" the Kingdom of Aragon as a sovereign or even to remain in secular life, but to instead enter a monastery to pursue a life "under a religious rule." King Jaime II informs Leonor's grandmother (Queen Maria de Molina) of the situation on October 22, and Queen Maria demands the return of Leonor immediately. Having renounced his royal rights, Prince Jaime finds afterward that he will not be allowed to enter a monastery either.
- October 29 – (Gen'ō 1, 15th day of 9th month) Nichiin of Japan's Daimoku sect refutes all other sects of Buddhism during an interrogation by the Kamakura shogunate, permitting the sect to continue.
- November 13 – King Eric VI of Denmark dies after a 33-year reign at Roskilde, leaving a vacancy that will not be filled until the January election of his brother Christopher II. During his rule, he attempts to control the routes of the Hanseatic League. The Hanse, an association of Baltic merchants, expels the English and Scots, and gains a monopoly of trade with Norway.
- December 21 – Representatives of England's King Edward II and Scotland's King Robert the Bruce sign a two-year truce. Hostilities are to cease until Christmas Day, 1321, with the Scots to build no new castles in the sheriffdoms of Berwick , Roxburgh, and Dumfries, and the English were to either transfer the Harbottle garrison in Northumberland to Scotland, or to destroy it. A long-term peace is still far off because of Edward's arrogant refusal to relinquish his claims of sovereignty over the Scots.

== Significant people ==
- Louis the Bavarian
- Wang Zhen (inventor)

== Births ==
1310

- March 5 – Przecław of Pogorzela, Polish bishop (d. 1376)
- April 30 – Casimir III the Great, king of Poland (d. 1368)
- November 29 – John de Mowbray, English nobleman (d. 1361)
- November 30 – Frederick II, German nobleman (d. 1349)
- Berenguer de Cruïlles, Spanish abbot and bishop (d. 1362)
- Dermot MacCarthy, Irish nobleman and magnate (d. 1367)
- Gil Álvarez Carrillo de Albornoz, Spanish cardinal (d. 1367)
- Guillaume Tirel (or "Taillevent"), French head chef (d. 1395)
- Jean de Beaumanoir, Breton nobleman and knight (d. 1366)
- Margaret I, French noblewoman (House of Capet) (d. 1382)
- Niccolò Acciaioli, Italian nobleman and seneschal (d. 1365)
- Simon Langham, English cardinal and archbishop (d. 1376)
- Urban V, French pope of the Catholic Church (d. 1370)

1311

- March 29 – Amadeus III, Savoyan nobleman and knight (d. 1367)
- April 3 – Margaret de Bohun, English noblewoman (d. 1391)
- July 1 – Liu Bowen, Chinese statesman and politician (d. 1375)
- August 13 – Alfonso XI, nicknamed "Alfonso the Avenger", King of Castile (d. 1350)
- unknown dates
  - Margaret I, German queen and Holy Roman Empress (d. 1356)
  - Munenaga, Japanese nobleman, prince and priest (d. 1385)
  - Peter I, Duke of Bourbon, French nobleman, knight and ambassador (d. 1356)

1312

- September 17 – William Donn de Burgh, Irish nobleman (d. 1333)
- November 13 – Edward III, king of England and Ireland (d. 1377)
- William II, Latin prince and knight (House of Barcelona) (d. 1338)

1313

- February 9 – Maria of Portugal, queen consort of Castile (d. 1357)
- February 14 – Thomas Beauchamp, English nobleman (d. 1369)
- April 17 – Constantine III of Armenia, king of Cilician Armenia (d. 1362)
- June 16 – Giovanni Boccaccio, Italian poet and writer (d. 1375)
- July 20 – John Tiptoft, English nobleman and chancellor (d. 1367)
- August 1 – Kōgon, emperor of Japan (Northern Court) (d. 1364)
- November 16 – Ibn al-Khatib, Arab polymath and writer (d. 1374)
- date unknown
  - Bartolus de Saxoferrato, Italian professor and jurist (d. 1357)
  - Blanche of France, French princess (House of Capet) (d. 1358)
  - Cola di Rienzo, Italian ruler (de facto) and politician (d. 1354)
  - Guy of Boulogne, French archbishop and diplomat (d. 1373)

1314

- January 13 – John Bardolf, English nobleman and peerage (d. 1363)
- March 10 – Ramathibodi I, Thai nobleman, prince and ruler (d. 1369)
- May 13 – Sergius of Radonezh, Russian abbot and reformer (d. 1392)
- June 24 – Philippa of Hainault, queen consort of Edward III (d. 1369)
- October 18 – Giles de Badlesmere, English nobleman and knight (d. 1338)
- date unknown
  - Akmal al-Din al-Babarti, Syrian scholar and theologian (d. 1384)
  - John of Arkel, Dutch nobleman, bishop and prince-bishop (d. 1378)
  - Li Shanchang, Chinese official, chancellor and politician (d. 1390)
  - Toqto'a (or "Dayong", Chinese official, historian and writer (d. 1356)
  - Valdemar III, King of Denmark from the House of Estridsen (d. 1364)
  - William Devereux the Younger, English nobleman (d. 1384)

1315

- January 20 – Yi Ja-chun, Korean nobleman and general (d. 1361)
- February 22 – Chunghye, Korean crown prince and king (d. 1344)
- April 5 – King James III of Majorca, who will be nicknamed "James the Unfortunate".(d. 1349)
- April 14 – Emir Muhammad IV of Granada, Nasrid ruler (sultan) of the Emirate of Granada, now part of Spain. (d. 1333)
- May 4 – John Segrave, English nobleman and landowner (d. 1353)
- May 20 – Bonne of Luxembourg, queen consort of France (d. 1349)
- date unknown
  - Albert IV, German nobleman (House of Ascania) (d. 1343)
  - Federico di Pagana, Genoese nobleman and doge (d. 1406)
  - The Empress Gi, Chinese concubine and empress consort as wife of Emperor Huizong of the Yuan dynasty (d. 1369)
  - James of Piedmont, Italian nobleman (House of Savoy) (d. 1367)
  - Joanna of Hainault, French noblewoman and regent (d. 1374)
  - Johann Hiltalinger, Swiss bishop, theologian and writer (d. 1392)
  - John FitzWalter, English nobleman, knight and landowner (d. 1361)
  - Kujō Michinori, Japanese nobleman (kugyō) and regent (d. 1349)
  - Louis V, German nobleman, knight, prince and co-ruler (d. 1361)
  - Marie de Bourbon, Latin princess (House of Bourbon) (d. 1387)
  - Pierre d'Orgemont, French politician and chancellor (d. 1389)
  - Raoul II of Brienne, French nobleman and constable (d. 1350)
  - Roger Beauchamp, English nobleman and chamberlain (d. 1380)

1316

- March 2 – Robert II, king of Scotland (House of Stuart) (d. 1390)
- April 11 – Édouard I, French nobleman, knight and marshal (d. 1351)
- May 14 – Charles IV, Holy Roman Emperor (d. 1378)
- August 15 – John of Eltham, English nobleman and prince (d. 1336)
- November 7 – Simeon of Moscow, Russian Grand Prince (d. 1353)
- November 15 – John the Posthumous, King of France (d. 1316)
- date unknown
  - An-Nasir Ahmad, Sultan of Egypt, Mamluk ruler (House of Bahri) (d. 1344)
  - Ch'oe Yŏng, Korean nobleman and general (d. 1388)
  - Fa Ngum, Tai nobleman and ruler of Lan Xang (d. 1393)
  - Henry II, Duke of Świdnica, Polish nobleman, knight and co-ruler (d. 1345)
  - Ibn Arafa, Tunisian scholar, imam and theologian (d. 1401)
  - John Beauchamp, English nobleman and admiral (d. 1360)
  - Magnus Eriksson, king of Sweden and Norway from the House of Bjälbo (d. 1374)
  - Nicholas Eymerich, Spanish inquisitor and theologian (d. 1399)
  - Niphon of Kafsokalyvia, Greek monk, mystic and writer (d. 1411)
  - Otho Holand, English nobleman, knight and governor (d. 1359)
  - Renaud de Carteret, French nobleman and rebel leader (d. 1382)
  - Robert de Herle, English nobleman, knight and admiral (d. 1364)
  - Simon Sudbury, English cleric, bishop and archbishop (d. 1381)

1317

- March 21 – Isabel de Verdun, English noblewoman (House of Clare) (d. 1349)
- date unknown
  - Blanche of Valois, queen consort of Germany and Bohemia (d. 1348)
  - Euphemia of Sweden, Swedish noblewoman and princess (d. 1370)
  - Coloman, Hungarian nobleman, prince, prelate and bishop (d. 1375)
  - Godfrey de Foljambe, English nobleman and Chief Justice (d. 1376)
  - Ichijō Tsunemichi, Japanese nobleman (kugyō) and regent (d. 1365)
  - John II, Sicilian nobleman and prince (House of Barcelona) (d. 1348)
  - Michael Szécsényi, Hungarian nobleman, cleric and bishop (d. 1377)
  - Ralph de Spigurnell, English nobleman, knight and admiral (d. 1373)
  - Vuk Kosača, Bosnian nobleman (knyaz), magnate and ruler (d. 1359)

1318

- June 18 – Eleanor of Woodstock, English princess and regent (d. 1355)
- June 29 – Yusuf I al-Muyyad billah, Nasrid ruler of Granada (d. 1354)
- September 11 – Eleanor of Lancaster, English noblewoman (d. 1372)
- date unknown
  - Albert II, German nobleman (House of Mecklenburg) (d. 1379)
  - Anne of Austria, German princess (House of Habsburg) (d. 1343)
  - Baha' al-Din Naqshband, Persian Sufi religious leader (d. 1389)
  - Bogislaw V the Great, German nobleman and knight (d. 1374)
  - Contance of Aragon, Spanish noblewoman and queen (d. 1346)
  - David de la Hay, Scottish nobleman and High Constable (d. 1346)
  - Kitabatake Akiie, Japanese nobleman (Minamoto clan) (d. 1338)
  - Margaret Audley, English noblewoman and landowner (d. 1349)
  - Margaret of Tyrol, Austrian princess (House of Gorizia) (d. 1369)
  - Maurice FitzGerald, Irish nobleman and Lord Justice (d. 1390)
  - Wenceslaus I, Polish nobleman, knight and co-ruler (d. 1364)

1319

- March 20 – Laurence Hastings, English nobleman (d. 1348)
- April 26 – John the Good, king of France (d. 1364)
- September 5 – Peter IV, king of Aragon (d. 1387)
- date unknown
  - Andrea II Muzaka, Albanian nobleman (d. 1372)
  - Charles of Blois-Châtillon, French nobleman (d. 1364)
  - Giulia della Rena, Italian nun, friar and saint (d. 1367)
  - Hasan Kuchak, Mongol nobleman and prince (d. 1343)
  - Haydar Amuli, Persian mystic and philosopher (d. 1385)
  - Henry V of Iron, Polish nobleman and knight (d. 1369)
  - James I, French nobleman and prince du sang (d. 1362)
  - Joan of Penthièvre, Breton noblewoman (d. 1384)
  - Kikuchi Takemitsu, Japanese general (d. 1373)
  - Leonardo di Montaldo, doge of Genoa (d. 1384)
  - María de la Cerda, Spanish noblewoman (d. 1375)
  - Märta Ulfsdotter, Swedish noblewoman (d. 1371)
  - Matteo II, Italian nobleman and co-ruler (d. 1355)
  - Philip III, French nobleman and knight (d. 1337)
  - Robert Marney, English knight and politician (d. 1400)
  - Stephen II, German nobleman and co-ruler (d. 1375)
  - Walter Paveley, English nobleman and knight (d. 1375)
  - William Dacre, English nobleman and knight (d. 1361)

== Deaths ==
1310

- February 11 – Marguerite d'Oingt, French nun (b. 1240)
- April 10 – Peire Autier, French religious leader (b. 1245)
- April 13 – Athinkhaya, Burmese ruler and regent (b. 1261)
- April 15 – Baybars II, Egyptian ruler and regent (b. 1250)
- April 26 – Constance of Montcada, French noblewoman
- May 20 – John de Moels, English nobleman and knight
- May 22 – Humilitas of Vallombrosa, Italian nun (b. 1226)
- May 25 – Otto III, Austrian nobleman (House of Gorizia)
- June 1 – Marguerite Porete, French mystic and author
- June 5 – Amalric of Tyre, Cypriot prince and statesman
- October 1 – Beatrice of Burgundy, French noblewoman
- October 14 – Blanche of Anjou, consort of King James II of Aragon
- October 28 – Athanasius I, Byzantine patriarch (b. 1230)
- November 23 – Abu al-Rabi Sulayman, Moroccan ruler
- December 10 – Stephen I, German nobleman (b. 1271)
- unknown dates
  - Abu al-Barakat al-Nasafi, Syrian scholar and theologian
  - Alexander MacDougall, Scottish nobleman and magnate
  - Constantine I, co-ruler of Cilician Armenia (b. 1278)
  - Dai Biaoyuan, Chinese littérateur, poet and writer (b. 1244)
  - Diego López V de Haro, Spanish nobleman and knight
  - Erik Eriksøn ("Eric Longlegs"), Danish nobleman and co-ruler
  - Gao Kegong (or "Fang Shan"), Chinese painter (b. 1248)
  - Geoffrey I, Luxemburgian nobleman (House of Vianden)
  - George Pachymeres, Byzantine historian and theologian
  - Henry II Kőszegi, Hungarian nobleman and knight
  - John de Soules, Scottish nobleman (House of de Soules)
  - Robert FitzRoger, English nobleman and knight (b. 1247)
  - Tommaso degli Stefani, Italian painter and artist (b. 1231)

1311

- January 27 – Külüg Khan, Mongol ruler and Emperor Wuzong of the Yuan dynasty China, (b. 1281)
- March 3 (date buried) – Antony Bek, English bishop and patriarch (b. 1245)
- March 15
  - Walter V, French nobleman (House of Brienne) (b. 1275)
  - Thomas III d'Autremencourt, Lord of Salona, Marshal of Achaea
  - George I Ghisi, Triarch of Euboea, Baron of Chalandritsa, Lord of Tinos, Mykonos, Serifos and Keos
- April - Botulf Botulfsson, Swedish man executed for heresy
- May 29 – James II of Majorca (b. 1243)
- August 13 – Pietro Gradenigo, Doge of Venice
- September 5 – Amadeus Aba, Hungarian oligarch
- December 14 – Margaret of Brabant, German queen consort (b. 1276)
- date unknown
  - David VIII of Georgia (b. 1273)
  - Arnold of Villanova, Spanish alchemist and physician (b. 1235)
  - Mangrai, founding king of Lan Na (b. 1238)
- probable – Bernard Saisset, Occitan bishop of Pamiers (b. 1232)

1312

- January 23 – Isabella of Villehardouin, Latin princess (b. 1263)
- March 9 – Beatrice, French noblewoman and co-ruler (b. 1249)
- March 10 – Casimir of Bytom, Polish nobleman (House of Piast)
- May 1 – Paul I, Croatian nobleman, knight and oligarch (b. 1245)
- May 13 – Theobald II, Duke of Lorraine, German nobleman (b. 1263)
- June 19 – Piers Gaveston, English nobleman and knight (b. 1284)
- August 27 – Angelo da Foligno, Italian priest (b. 1226)
- September 7 – Ferdinand IV, king of Castile and León (b. 1285)
- October 27
  - Gentile Portino da Montefiore, Italian cardinal-priest (b. 1240)
  - John II, Duke of Brabant, Dutch nobleman and knight (b. 1275)
- October 28 – Elisabeth of Carinthia, queen of Germany (b. 1262)
- October 29 – Landolfo Brancaccio, Italian aristocrat and cardinal
- November 2 – Afonso of Portugal, Portuguese prince (b. 1263)
- November 6 – Christina von Stommeln, German nun (b. 1242)
- November 9 – Mujū Dōkyō, Japanese Buddhist monk (b. 1227)
- December 7 – Michael II, Syrian Orthodox patriarch of Antioch
- December 13 – John the Parricide, German nobleman (b. 1290)
- Eschiva of Ibelin, Outremer noblewoman and co-ruler (b. 1253)
- Guido della Torre, Italian nobleman and rebel leader (b. 1259)
- Malatesta da Verucchio, Italian nobleman and knight (b. 1212)
- Reginald le Chen, Scottish nobleman and high sheriff (b. 1235)
- Siemowit of Dobrzyń, Polish prince and knight (House of Piast)
- Valdemar IV, Danish nobleman and knight (House of Estridsen)
- Xenia of Tarusa, Russian noblewoman and princess (b. 1246)
- Zayn al-Din al-Amidi, Arab scholar, academic, jurist and writer

1313

- February 28 – John Hastings, English nobleman, knight and peer (b. 1262)
- April 13 – Guillaume de Nogaret, French statesman and councillor (b. 1260)
- April 20 – Bolesław II, Polish nobleman, prince and co-ruler (House of Piast)
- May 11 – Robert Winchelsey, English archbishop and theologian (b. 1245)
- May 14 – Bolko I, Polish nobleman and co-ruler (House of Piast) (b. 1258)
- June 18 – John de Burgh ("John Burke"), Irish nobleman and knight (b. 1286)
- July 24 – Ralph Baldock (Ralph Baldoc), English bishop and Lord Chancellor
- July 27 – Bernhard of Prambach, German bishop (b. 1220)
- August 10 – Guido de Baysio, Italian canonist, professor, jurist and writer
- August 24 – Henry VII, Holy Roman Emperor (b. 1273)
- September 8 – Rupen of Montfort, Cypriot nobleman (House of Montfort)
- September 13 – Notburga of Eben, Austrian peasant and saint (b. 1265)
- September 24 – Philip Despenser, English nobleman and knight (b. 1290)
- September 29 – Imagina of Limburg, queen consort of Germany (b. 1255)
- October 28 – Elisabeth of Carinthia, queen consort of Germany (b. 1262)
- November 18 – Constance of Portugal, queen consort of Castile (b. 1290)
- November 26 – Thomas de Multon, English nobleman and knight (b. 1276)
- date unknown
  - Baldwin of Ibelin, Cypriot nobleman and knight (House of Ibelin)
  - Baybars al-Ala'i, Mamluk nobleman and governor (House of Bahri)
  - Bolad ("Chingsang"), Mongol minister, diplomat and chancellor
  - Gonsalvus of Spain, Spanish priest, theologian and philosopher
  - Martim Afonso Chichorro, Portuguese nobleman and knight (b. 1250)
  - Rudolf I, German nobleman, knight and co-ruler (House of Zähringen)
  - Simon of Clermont, French nobleman and bishop (House of Clermont)
  - Takatsukasa Mototada, Japanese nobleman (Fujiwara Clan) (b. 1247)
  - Tekle Haymanot ("Tekle the Righteous"), Ethiopian monk and hermit (b. 1215)
  - Walter de Huntercombe, English nobleman and governor (b. 1247)
  - Walter de Thornbury, Irish cleric, statesman and Lord Chancellor

1314

- January 21 – Muhammad III, Nasrid ruler (sultan) (b. 1257)
- January 30 – Nicholas III of Saint Omer, Latin nobleman
- February 8 – Helen of Anjou, queen of Serbia (b. 1235)
- February 10 – Riccardo Petroni, Italian cardinal (b. 1250)
- March 4 – Jakub Świnka, Polish priest and archbishop
- March 18
  - Geoffroy de Charney, French nobleman and preceptor
  - Jacques de Molay, French nobleman and Grand Master
- April 20 – Clement V, pope of the Catholic Church (b. 1264)
- May 3 – Emilia Bicchieri, Italian nun and prioress (b. 1238)
- May 31 – James Salomoni, Italian priest, prior and saint (b. 1231)
- June 23 – Henry de Bohun, English nobleman, knight and duelist
- June 24 – (Battle of Bannockburn)
  - Gilbert de Clare, English nobleman, knight and peerage (b. 1291)
  - Giles d'Argentan, Norman nobleman, favourite and knight (b. 1280)
  - Robert Clifford, English nobleman, knight and High Sheriff (b. 1274)
  - William de Vescy, Norman nobleman, knight and peerage (b. 1296)
  - William Marshal, English nobleman, knight and Marshal of Ireland
- September 30 – Yolanda I, French noblewoman and ruler (suo jure) (b. 1257)
- October 21 – Geoffrey de Geneville, English nobleman and diplomat (b. 1226)
- November 20 – Albert II the Degenerate, German ruler and knight (b. 1240)
- November 25 – Nicholas "the Child", German nobleman and knight (b. 1261)
- November 29 – Philip IV the Fair, King of France from the House of Capet, in a hunting accident (b. 1268)
- date unknown
  - Ahmed al-Ghubrini, Algerian scholar, biographer and chronicler (b. 1264)
  - Alan la Zouche, English nobleman, knight, governor and steward (b. 1267)
  - Alexander Bonini, Italian Minister General, philosopher and writer (b. 1270)
  - Ermengol X, Spanish nobleman and adviser (House of Cabrera) (b. 1254)
  - Guo Shoujing, Chinese astronomer, mathematician and politician (b. 1231)
  - Henry Percy, English nobleman, landowner, magnate and knight (b. 1273)
  - John Balliol ("Toom Tabard"), king of Scotland (House of Balliol) (b. 1249)
  - Nicholas III, Hungarian nobleman and Master of the Treasury (b. 1285)
  - Nikō, Japanese Buddhist monk, teacher and religious leader (b. 1253)
  - Rainier I, Genoese nobleman and knight (House of Grimaldi) (b. 1267)
  - Sanggye Pal, Tibetan teacher and Imperial Preceptor (dishi) (b. 1267)
  - Stephen I Kotromanić, Bosnian nobleman (ban) and ruler (b. 1242)
  - Takezaki Suenaga, Japanese nobleman, retainer and samurai (b. 1246)
  - Violante Manuel, Spanish noblewoman and princess (infanta) (b. 1265)
  - William Devereux, English nobleman, landowner and knight (b. 1244)
  - Zhu Shije (or "Hanqing"), Chinese mathematician and writer (b. 1249)
  - Wedem Arad, Emperor of Ethiopia

1315

- January 15 – Gyeguk, Korean queen consort of Goryeo (b. 1285)
- March 10 – Agnes Blannbekin, Austrian mystic and writer (b. 1244)
- April 30
  - Enguerrand de Marigny, French Grand Chamberlain (b. 1260)
  - Margaret of Burgundy, queen consort of France (b. 1290)
- May 1 – Margaret of Brandenburg, German noblewoman (b. 1270)
- May 9 – Hugh V, French nobleman (House of Burgundy) (b. 1294)
- June 27 – Mieszko I, Polish nobleman and knight (House of Piast)
- July 24 – Otto II, German nobleman and prince (House of Ascania)
- August 12 – Guy de Beauchamp, English nobleman and magnate
- August 18 – Hōjō Hirotoki, Japanese nobleman and regent (b. 1279)
- August 29 – (Killed in the Battle of Montecatini)
  - Charles of Taranto, Italian nobleman (House of Anjou) (b. 1296)
  - Peter Tempesta, nicknamed "Storm", Italian nobleman and knight (b. 1291)
- August 31 – Andrea Dotti, Italian nobleman and preacher (b. 1256)
- November 24 – Fulk FitzWarin, English nobleman and landowner
- December 6 – William Greenfield, English rector and archbishop
- December 13 – Gaston I, Occitan nobleman and knight (b. 1287)
- date unknown
  - Abu al-Ghayth ibn Abi Numayy, Hasanid ruler of Mecca
  - Adolph VI, German nobleman, knight and ruler (b. 1256)
  - Esclaramunda of Foix, queen consort of Majorca (b. 1250)
  - Henry of Treviso, German hermit, pilgrim and saint (b. 1250)
  - Ibn al-Raqqam, Andalusian astronomer and jurist (b. 1250)
  - Jean Pitard, French physician, surgeon and writer (b. 1228)
  - John I of Chalon-Arlay, French nobleman (House of Chalon-Arlay) (b. 1258)
  - Juan Núñez II de Lara, Spanish nobleman (House of Lara) (b. 1276)
  - Lanfranc of Milan, Italian cleric, surgeon and writer (b. 1250)
  - Lu Zhi, Chinese official, politician, poet and writer (b. 1243)
  - Margaret of Villehardouin, Latin noblewoman and princess
  - Nichigen, Japanese Buddhist monk and disciple (b. 1262)
  - Robert FitzPayne, English nobleman, knight and governor
  - Stephen Ákos, Hungarian nobleman and oligarch (b. 1260)

1316

- January 4 – Alauddin Khalji, Indian governor and ruler (b. 1266)
- February 18 – Nicholas II of Werle, German nobleman (b. 1274)
- March 2 – Marjorie Bruce, Scottish noblewoman and princess
- March 12 – Stefan Dragutin, king of Serbia (House of Nemanjić)
- March 13 – John Devereux, Anglo-Norman nobleman (b. 1250)
- May 4 – Reginald of Bar, French archdeacon, bishop and writer
- May 5 – Elizabeth of Rhuddlan, English noblewoman (b. 1282)
- June 5 – Louis the Quarrelsome, king of France (b. 1289)
- June 29 – Henry Woodlock, English prior and bishop (b. 1250)
- July 5 – (Battle of Manolada)
  - Ferdinand of Majorca, Spanish nobleman and prince
  - John II of Nivelet, Latin nobleman, knight and prince
- July 10 – Leszek of Dobrzyń, Polish nobleman and prince
- July 18 – Yasokjin, Mongol noblewoman and queen consort
- July 27 – Theobald de Verdun, English nobleman (b. 1278)
- August 2 – Louis of Burgundy, French nobleman and prince
- August 17 – Albert I, German nobleman (House of Ascania)
- August 30 – Giovanni Pipino I, Italian nobleman and knight
- September 10 – John FitzGerald, Anglo-Norman nobleman
- November 20 – John the Posthumous, king of France
- November 26 – Robert Wishart, Scottish bishop (b. 1240)
- December 16 – Öljaitü, Mongol viceroy and ruler (b. 1282)
- December 17 – Juan Fernández, Spanish bishop-elect
- December 18 – Gilbert Segrave, English bishop (b. 1266)
- December 22 – Giles of Rome, Italian theologian (b. 1243)
- date unknown
  - Berenguer Estañol, Latin nobleman and vicar general
  - Edmond de Caillou, French nobleman and favourite
  - Geoffroy d'Ablis, French Dominican priest and inquisitor
  - Guillaume Guiart, French chronicler and poet
  - Guo Shoujing, Chinese astronomer and engineer (b. 1231)
  - John the Lame, Scottish nobleman and admiral
  - Malik Kafur, Indian general, governor and viceroy (nawab)
  - Matilda of Brandenburg, German noblewoman and regent
  - Michael Kantakouzenos, Byzantine general and governor
  - Najm al-Din al-Tufi, Arab scholar and theologian (b. 1276)
  - Sang Sapurba, Indonesian nobleman and ruler (b. 1245)
  - Shihab-ud-din Omar, Indian ruler of the Delhi Sultanate
  - Simon Montagu, English nobleman and admiral (b. 1259)
  - Ulrich of Sanneck, German nobleman and knight (b. 1255)
  - Vytenis, Lithuanian nobleman and Grand Prince (b. 1260)
  - William Ros, Scottish nobleman and claimant (b. 1255)

1317

- February 6 – Brinolfo Algotsson, Swedish bishop and theologian (b. 1240)
- February 7 – Robert de Clermont, French nobleman and prince (b. 1256)
- February 11 – Ralph Fitzwilliam, English nobleman and knight (b. 1256)
- April 6 – Guy IV, French nobleman and Grand Butler (House of Châtillon)
- April 19 – Nitchō, Japanese Buddhist monk, cleric and scholar (b. 1252)
- April 20 – Agnes of Montepulciano, Italian prioress and saint (b. 1268)
- May 23 – Guy of Avesnes, French bishop (House of Avesnes) (b. 1253)
- June 23 – Thawun Gyi, Burmese founder and ruler of Toungoo (b. 1258)
- June 25 – Henry of Harclay, English philosopher and chancellor (b. 1270)
- August 14 – Bernard de Castanet, French diplomat and bishop (b. 1240)
- September 21 – Viola of Teschen, queen consort of Bohemia and Poland
- October 8 – Fushimi, Japanese emperor and calligrapher (b. 1265)
- October 26 – Alice of Hainault, French noblewoman (House of Avesnes)
- November 9 – Manfred of Sicily, Sicilian nobleman and prince (b. 1306)
- November 13 – Yahballaha III, Turkic patriarch of the Church of the East
- November 28 – Yishan Yining, Chinese monk and calligrapher (b. 1247)
- December 15 – Maria of Bytom, queen consort of Hungary and Croatia
- December 24 – Jean de Joinville, French historian and writer (b. 1224)
- date unknown
  - Dujam II, Croatian nobleman and oligarch (House of Frankopan)
  - Gerard of Bologna, Italian Carmelite theologian and philosopher
  - Guillemette of Neufchâtel, Swiss noblewoman (suo jure) (b. 1260)
  - Irene Violante of Montferrat, Byzantine empress consort (b. 1274)
  - John I Orsini, Latin nobleman, knight and ruler (House of Orsini)
  - John the Illustrious, German nobleman and knight (b. 1302)
  - Malise III of Strathearn, Scottish nobleman and politician (b. 1257)
  - Parsoma ("the Naked"), Egyptian Coptic hermit and saint (b. 1257)
  - Ram Khamhaeng the Great, Tai ruler of Sukhothai (b. 1239)
  - Robert of Burgundy, French nobleman and knight (b. 1300)
  - Roger Brabazon, English lawyer and Chief Justice (b. 1247)
  - Stephen de Dunnideer, English bishop-elect
  - Tolberto III, Italian nobleman (House of Caminesi) (b. 1263)
  - Wolfert II van Borselen, Dutch nobleman and knight (b. 1280)

1318

- January 17 – Erwin von Steinbach, German architect (b. 1244)
- February 14
  - Henry Lackland, German nobleman and ruler (b. 1256)
  - Margaret of France, queen consort of England (b. 1279)
- March 11 – Amanieu II, French nobleman and archbishop (b. 1232)
- April 26 – Matilda of Brunswick-Lüneburg, German co-ruler (b. 1276)
- May 10 – Richard de Clare, English nobleman, knight and steward
- May 26 – Fujiwara no Kishi, Japanese empress consort (b. 1252)
- June 23 – Gilles I Aycelin de Montaigu, French counselor (b. 1252)
- July 25 – Nicholas I, Bohemian nobleman, knight and ruler (b. 1255)
- August 14 – Giacomo Colonna, Italian priest and cardinal (b. 1250)
- August 20 – Cassone della Torre, Italian nobleman and patriarch
- September 22 – Albert the Fat, German nobleman (b. 1268)
- October 14 – (Battle of Faughart)
  - Edward Bruce, Scottish nobleman and High King
  - Philip Mowbray, Scottish nobleman and governor
- November 22 – Mikhail of Tver, Kievan Grand Prince (b. 1271)
- November 25 – Philip of Ibelin, Outremer nobleman and knight
- November 29 – Heinrich Frauenlob, German musician and poet
- December 16 – Dirk II van Brederode, Dutch nobleman (b. 1256)
- December 19 – Husseini Heravi, Persian poet and writer (b. 1245)
- date unknown
  - St. Odisho (Abdisho bar Berika), Syrian bishop and writer
  - Eric Magnusson, Swedish prince and knight (House of Bjälbo)
  - Gilbert Middleton, English nobleman, knight and rebel leader
  - Henry of Hachberg-Sausenberg, German nobleman (b. 1300)
  - Jamal al-Din al-Watwat, Egyptian scholar and writer (b. 1235)
  - Jean IV de Beaumont, French nobleman, knight and marshal
  - John II Doukas of Thessaly, Byzantine nobleman and ruler (sebastokrator)
  - John de Soules, Scoto-Norman landowner (House of de Soules)
  - Konoe Tsunehira, Japanese nobleman (Fujiwara clan) (b. 1287)
  - Rashid-al-Din Hamadani, Persian historian and writer (b. 1247)
  - Thomas I Komnenos Doukas, Byzantine nobleman (assassinated) (b. 1288)
  - Valdemar Magnusson, Swedish nobleman and prince (b. 1283)

1319

- January 12 – Kamāl al-Dīn al-Fārisī, Persian scientist (b. 1267)
- May 8 – Haakon V Magnusson, king of Norway (b. 1270)
- May 19 – Louis of Évreux, son of King Philip the Bold (b. 1276)
- June 25 – (Battle of the Vega of Granada)
  - John of Castile, Spanish nobleman and prince (b. 1262)
  - Peter of Castile, Spanish nobleman and prince (b. 1290)
- August 12 – Rudolf I, German nobleman and knight (b. 1274)
- August 14 – Waldemar the Great, German nobleman (b. 1280)
- September 23 – Henry of Wierzbna, Polish priest and bishop
- October 18 – William Montagu, English nobleman and knight
- November 1 – Uguccione della Faggiuola, Italian condottieri
- November 2 – John Sandale, English bishop and chancellor
- November 5 – Simone Ballachi, Italian monk and friar (b. 1240)
- November 8 – Bokguk, Korean Grand Princess and queen
- November 11 – Beatrice of Luxembourg, queen of Hungary
- November 13 – Eric VI Menved, king of Denmark (b. 1274)
- December 28 – Mattia de Nazarei, Italian abbess (b. 1253)
- date unknown
  - Agnes Haakonsdatter, Norwegian princess (b. 1290)
  - Andrea I, Albanian prince (House of Muzaka) (b. 1279)
  - Bernard VI, French nobleman (House of Armagnac)
  - Guan Daosheng, Chinese painter and poet (b. 1262)
  - Ingeborg Magnusdotter, queen of Denmark (b. 1277)
  - Jan Sindewint, Flemish monk, theologian and writer
  - Jordan Óge de Exeter, Anglo-Irish knight and sheriff
  - Qadi Baydawi, Persian jurist, theologian and writer
  - Remigio dei Girolami, Italian theologian and writer
