= 1318 =

1318 in various calendars
- Gregorian calendar: 1318; MCCCXVIII
- Ab urbe condita: 2071
- Armenian calendar: 767; ԹՎ ՉԿԷ
- Assyrian calendar: 6068
- Balinese saka calendar: 1239–1240
- Bengali calendar: 724–725
- Berber calendar: 2268
- English Regnal year: 11 Edw. 2 – 12 Edw. 2
- Buddhist calendar: 1862
- Burmese calendar: 680
- Byzantine calendar: 6826–6827
- Chinese calendar: 丁巳年 (Fire Snake); 4015 or 3808 — to — 戊午年 (Earth Horse); 4016 or 3809
- Coptic calendar: 1034–1035
- Discordian calendar: 2484
- Ethiopian calendar: 1310–1311
- Hebrew calendar: 5078–5079
- Hindu calendars
- Vikram Samvat: 1374–1375
- Shaka Samvat: 1239–1240
- Kali Yuga: 4418–4419
- Holocene calendar: 11318
- Igbo calendar: 318–319
- Iranian calendar: 696–697
- Islamic calendar: 717–718
- Japanese calendar: Bunpō 2 (文保２年)
- Javanese calendar: 1229–1230
- Julian calendar: 1318; MCCCXVIII
- Korean calendar: 3651
- Minguo calendar: 594 before ROC 民前594年
- Nanakshahi calendar: −150
- Thai solar calendar: 1860–1861
- Tibetan calendar: མེ་མོ་སྦྲུལ་ལོ་ (female Fire-Snake); 1444 or 1063 or 291 — to — ས་ཕོ་རྟ་ལོ་ (male Earth-Horse); 1445 or 1064 or 292

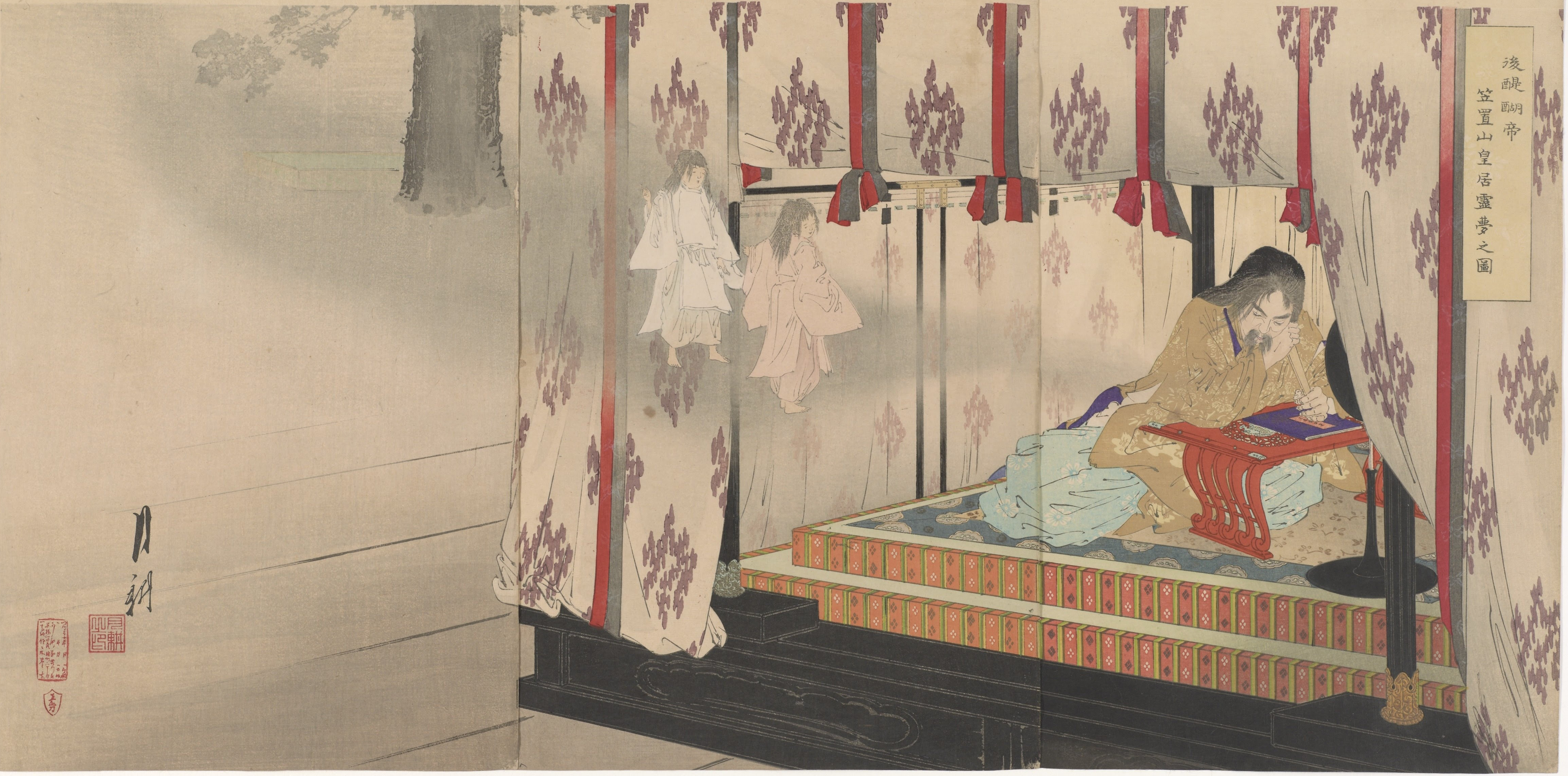
March 29: Go-Daigo becomes the 96th emperor of Japan

Year 1318 (MCCCXVIII) was a common year starting on Sunday of the Julian calendar.

== Events ==
=== January – March ===
- January 23 – Pope John XXII issues the papal bull Gloriosam ecclesiam, excommunicating the Fraticelli, or Spiritual Franciscans from the Roman Catholic Church. The group is known for pursuing strictly the Franciscan ideal of Apostolic poverty and attempting to force others to do so. The Pope cites as reasons for the excommunication that the adherents are guilty of making accusations of corruption, against the Church, denial of the authority of priests, refusal to take oaths to the church, teaching that priests could not confer sacraments, and claiming to be the only group to be true observers of the Gospel.
- January 26 – Sir Gilbert Middleton, an English knight who had rebelled against King Edward II and kidnapped the Bishop of Durham on September 1, is convicted of treason and then executed by being hanged, drawn and quartered.
- February 12 – In Italy, Cangrande I della Scala, Lord of Verona successfully takes Padua. Led by Jacopo I da Carrara, the Paduan Greater Council agrees to cede the territories of Monselice, Este, Castelbaldo and Montagnana to Cangrande for life.
- February 14 – In Germany, Henry II becomes the new Margrave of Brandenburg-Stendal upon the death of his father Henry Lackland.
- March 27 – King Philip of France and Navarre reaches an agreement with the Capetian House of Burgundy to settle dissatisfaction over his claim of the crown as the brother of the late Louis X, ahead of Joan of Burgundy, the 4-year-old daughter of Louis X. King Philip agrees that Joan will arrange for Joan to eventually become the Queen of Navarre.
- March 29 – (Bunpō 2, 26th day of 2nd month) Japan's Emperor Hanazono abdicates the throne after a 9-year reign. He is succeeded by his cousin, Go-Daigo, who will rule until 1339).

=== April – June ===
- April 1
  - Pope John XXII creates the Archdiocese of Soltaniyeh (now located in northwestern Iran), bringing the Roman Catholic hierarchy to the Ilkhanate in Persia, with the Dominican missionary Francesco da Perugia (Francon de Perouse) as the first Archbishop. Francesco and six bishops arrive on August 1.
  - After the appointment of Guglielmo di Balaeto as rector by Pope John XXII with broad powers before the city of Benevento, the inhabitants rise against the Pope and demand some political autonomy. Finally, the rebellion is crushed by papal forces.
- April 2 – After a two-day battle, Scottish forces under James the Black retake Berwick-upon-Tweed. The fall of Berwick is a severe blow for King Edward II, and its loss is compounded by the fall of the Northumbrian castles of Wark-on-Tweed (Carham Castle), Harbottle and Mitford.
- April 16 – An agreement with Birger, King of Sweden is made to release his two brothers Valdemar, Duke of Finland and Eric Magnusson, Duke of Södermanland, who had been imprisoned at Nyköping Castle since December 10. The treaty is brokered by Valdemar's wife Ingeborg Eriksdottir of Norway and Eric's wife, Princess Ingeborg of Norway, who pledge for Valdemar and Eric to renounce all claims to the Swedish throne. However, Valdemar and Eric have already died inside the prison, and the discovery leads to a rebellion against King Birger.
- April 30 – The coronation ceremony of Go-Daigo as Emperor of Japan is held.
- May 7 – At the marketplace in the French city of Marseille, four of the most defiant members of the Fraticelli (or Spiritual Franciscans) are found guilty of heresy and burned at the stake.
- May 10 – Battle of Dysert O'Dea: An Irish confederation defeats the Hiberno-Normans under Richard de Clare. During the battle, some 500 men are killed, along with 80 English nobles.
- May – Having captured Berwick-upon-Tweed, Scottish forces under King Robert the Bruce raid Yorkshire and burn Northallerton, Boroughbridge and Knaresborough (where some 140 houses are destroyed). They also terrorize the citizens of Ripon, who are spared destruction, on payment of 1,000 marks.
- June 11 – John Hotham is appointed as the Lord Chancellor of England, the highest ranking office for a member of parliament, by King Edward II.
- June 12 – Russians destroy areas of Finland, burn Kuusisto Castle, and rob Turku.
- June 13 – Robert, King of Naples delivers an ultimatum to Matilda of Hainaut, ruler of the Greek Principality of Achaea, to accept marriage to John of Gravina or to lose her right to rule.
- June 18 – The arranged marriage of 6-year-old Joan of Burgundy and 12-year-old Philip of Navarre is held as part of a contract for Joan and Philip to eventually become the co-monarchs of Navarre. The two will succeed to the monarchy in 1328.
- June 27 – The reign of King Birger of Sweden ends as supporters of his late brothers, Valdemar and Eric, storm the Nyköping Castle. Birger and his wife flee to Stegeborg Castle, then flee again when the rebels capture the stronghold in August.

=== July – September ===
- July 13 – Rashid al-Din Hamadani, the Grand Vizier of the Ilkhanate in Iran during the reign of the Mongol Ilkhan Öljaitü, is convicted of the 1316 murder of the Ilkhan, and is executed (along with his son Ibrahim Izzaddin).
- July 22 – (22 Jumada I 718) In what is now northwestern Algeria, Abu Tashufin I assassinates his father, Abu Hammu I, Sultan of Tlemcen, and becomes the new monarch.
- July 25 – In Italy, Jacopo I da Carrara becomes the first Lord of Padua, founding the Carraresi dynasty that will rule the independent city state for almost 90 years before its conquest and annexation by the Republic of Venice following a war in 1405.
- August 9 – Treaty of Leake: Edward II signs an agreement with the "Middle Party" led by his cousin, Earl Thomas of Lancaster, and his court followers at East Leake in Nottinghamshire.
- September 13 – Pope John XXII appoints a commission of three members (Uberto d'Ormont, Bishop of Naples; Angelo Tignosi, Bishop of Viterbo; and notary Pandulpho de Sabbello) to take evidence on the matter of the canonization of Thomas Aquinas. Testimony is taken of 42 witnesses between July 21 and September 18, 1319.
- September 22 – Otto the Mild, becomes ruler over the Duchy of Brunswick-Lüneburg in Lower Saxony, after the death of his father Albert the Fat

=== October – December ===
- October 14 – Battle of Faughart: A Hibernian and Norman force defeats a Scotch-Irish army commanded by Edward Bruce, who had proclaimed himself High King of Ireland. Edward Bruce is killed in the battle, ending the Bruce campaign in Ireland.
- November 22 – Grand Prince Mikhail of Tver is summoned by Özbeg Khan at Sarai, the capital of the Golden Horde. After his arrival, he is executed.
- December 3 – The Parliament of Scotland meets at Scone and votes to designate Robert Stewart, grandson of King Robert the Bruce as the heir presumptive. Robert Stewart is the son of Robert the Bruce's late daughter Marjorie Bruce and of Walter Stewart. On the birth of David as Robert the Bruce's son in 1324, Robert Stewart will become second in line for the throne, eventually becoming King Robert II in 1371.

== Births ==
- June 18 – Eleanor of Woodstock, English princess and regent (d. 1355)
- June 29 – Yusuf I al-Muyyad billah, Nasrid ruler of Granada (d. 1354)
- September 11 – Eleanor of Lancaster, English noblewoman (d. 1372)
- date unknown
  - Albert II, German nobleman (House of Mecklenburg) (d. 1379)
  - Anne of Austria, German princess (House of Habsburg) (d. 1343)
  - Baha' al-Din Naqshband, Persian Sufi religious leader (d. 1389)
  - Bogislaw V the Great, German nobleman and knight (d. 1374)
  - Constance of Aragon, Spanish noblewoman and queen (d. 1346)
  - David de la Hay, Scottish nobleman and High Constable (d. 1346)
  - Kitabatake Akiie, Japanese nobleman (Minamoto clan) (d. 1338)
  - Margaret Audley, English noblewoman and landowner (d. 1349)
  - Margaret of Tyrol, Austrian princess (House of Gorizia) (d. 1369)
  - Maurice FitzGerald, Irish nobleman and Lord Justice (d. 1390)
  - Wenceslaus I, Polish nobleman, knight and co-ruler (d. 1364)

== Deaths ==
- January 17 – Erwin von Steinbach, German architect (b. 1244)
- February 14
  - Henry Lackland, German nobleman and ruler (b. 1256)
  - Margaret of France, queen consort of England (b. 1279)
- March 11 – Amanieu II, French nobleman and archbishop (b. 1232)
- April 26 – Matilda of Brunswick-Lüneburg, German co-ruler (b. 1276)
- May 10 – Richard de Clare, English nobleman, knight and steward
- May 26 – Fujiwara no Kishi, Japanese empress consort (b. 1252)
- June 23 – Gilles I Aycelin de Montaigu, French counselor (b. 1252)
- July 25 – Nicholas I, Bohemian nobleman, knight and ruler (b. 1255)
- August 14 – Giacomo Colonna, Italian priest and cardinal (b. 1250)
- August 20 – Cassone della Torre, Italian nobleman and patriarch
- September 22 – Albert the Fat, German nobleman (b. 1268)
- October 14 – (Battle of Faughart)
  - Edward Bruce, Scottish nobleman and High King
  - Philip Mowbray, Scottish nobleman and governor
- November 22 – Mikhail of Tver, Kievan Grand Prince (b. 1271)
- November 25 – Philip of Ibelin, Outremer nobleman and knight
- November 29 – Heinrich Frauenlob, German musician and poet
- December 16 – Dirk II van Brederode, Dutch nobleman (b. 1256)
- December 19 – Husseini Heravi, Persian poet and writer (b. 1245)
- date unknown
  - St. Odisho (Abdisho bar Berika), Syrian bishop and writer
  - Eric Magnusson, Swedish prince and knight (House of Bjälbo)
  - Gilbert Middleton, English nobleman, knight and rebel leader
  - Henry of Hachberg-Sausenberg, German nobleman (b. 1300)
  - Jamal al-Din al-Watwat, Egyptian scholar and writer (b. 1235)
  - Jean IV de Beaumont, French nobleman, knight and marshal
  - John II Doukas of Thessaly, Byzantine nobleman and ruler (sebastokrator)
  - John de Soules, Scoto-Norman landowner (House of de Soules)
  - Konoe Tsunehira, Japanese nobleman (Fujiwara clan) (b. 1287)
  - Rashid-al-Din Hamadani, Persian historian and writer (b. 1247)
  - Thomas I Komnenos Doukas, Byzantine nobleman (assassinated) (b. 1288)
  - Valdemar Magnusson, Swedish nobleman and prince (b. 1283)
