= Al-Amidi =

al-Amidi (after Amid city, modern Diyarbakır) may refer to:

- Abo al-Qasim al-Amidi
- Hamid al-Amidi (Hamid Aytaç)
- Sayf al-Din al-Amidi
- Zayn al-Din al-Amidi
