= John de Soules (Guardian of Scotland) =

Guardian of Scotland

Sir John de Soules
- Arms of John de Soules; Barry of six argent and gules, a bendlet

Guardian of Scotland (Second Interregnum)
- In office 1301–1304
- Preceded by: John III Comyn; William de Lamberton; Ingram de Umfraville
- Succeeded by: Robert I (as King of Scotland)

Personal details
- Died: 1310

Sir John de Soules (or de Soulis or Soules) (died 1310) was Guardian of Scotland from 1301 to 1304 in the Wars of Scottish Independence. He was a member of the de Soules family.

== Life ==
John was the second son of William I de Soules and Ermengarde Durward. John had previously protected Galloway from Sir Andrew Harclay, Earl of Carlisle and Warden of the English March. He was appointed in 1292 as the custodian of Hugh Lovel. After the appointment of a Council of Twelve — in practice, a new panel of Guardians — by the leading men of Scotland, which sidelined King John Balliol in 1295, Soules was sent to France along with other envoys to negotiate an alliance. In 1301 after the resignations of Robert the Bruce and John Comyn he was appointed Guardian of Scotland. John was exiled and died in France in 1310.

== Marriage and issue ==
He married Halwise Stewart, the daughter of Alexander Stewart, 4th High Steward of Scotland and Jean Macrory, they had the following known issue:

- Muriel, married Richard Lovel, had issue.

== Sources ==
- McAndrew, Bruce A.; Scotland's Historic Heraldry, Boydell Press, 2006. ISBN 9781843832614
- Traquair, Peter Freedom's Sword.
