= Guido de Baysio =

Italian canon law jurist (died 1313)

Guido de Baysio (born about the middle of the thirteenth century of a noble Ghibelline family; died at Avignon, 10 August 1313) was an Italian canonist. Having held the position of archdeacon, Baysio is often known by the name Archidiaconus and thus quoted.

== Biography ==
The probable place of his birth is Reggio, where he also studied law under Guido de Suzaria. Here he became, successively, doctor and professor of canon law and also obtained an ecclesiastical benefice as canon. Gerhard, Bishop of Parma (d. 1301) attached Guido to himself; and remained his patron also as Cardinal-Archbishop of Sabina.

In 1296, Pope Boniface VIII appointed Baysio Archdeacon of Bologna, and chancellor of the University of Bologna. Here he at first taught canon law privately and later on became a public professor, a position he held for three years.

Called to Avignon in 1304, he retained the dignity of archdeacon, held the office of papal chaplain, and also served in the Apostolic chancery until his death.

== Works ==
Baysio's chief work was Rosarium Decretorum, a commentary on the Decretum of Gratian, which he wrote about the year 1300 and dedicated to his patron Gerhard. It is a collection of older glossaries, not contained in the Glossa Ordinaria, and principally compiled from Huguccio. Many additions to the glossary which are found in the editions, published since 1505 (Paris), are taken from the Rosarium of Baysio and appear over his name. The Rosarium has gone through many editions.

During the brief pontificate of Pope Benedict XI (1303–1304), he wrote an accurate and complete, but rather diffuse, commentary on the "Liber sextus". His stay at Avignon was marked by a Tractatus super haeresi et aliis criminibus in causa Templariorum et D. Bonifacii. This latter work was written in connection with the condemnation of the Templars at the Council of Vienne. The second part of the work constitutes a defence of the orthodoxy of Boniface VIII.
