= Eschiva =

Eschiva may refer to:

- Eschiva of Bures (fl. 1158–1187), princess of Galilee
- Eschiva of Ibelin (wife of Aimery) (1160-1196), queen-consort of Cyprus
- Eschiva (born between 1187 and 1204), daughter of William of Saint-Omer
- Eschiva of Montbéliard (fl. 1212–1236), lady of Beirut
- Eschiva of Saint-Omer (died 1265), princess of Galilee
- Eschiva of Ibelin (born before 1255), daughter of Guy of Ibelin, constable of Cyprus
- Eschiva of Ibelin, Lady of Beirut (died 1312)
