= Henry of Treviso =

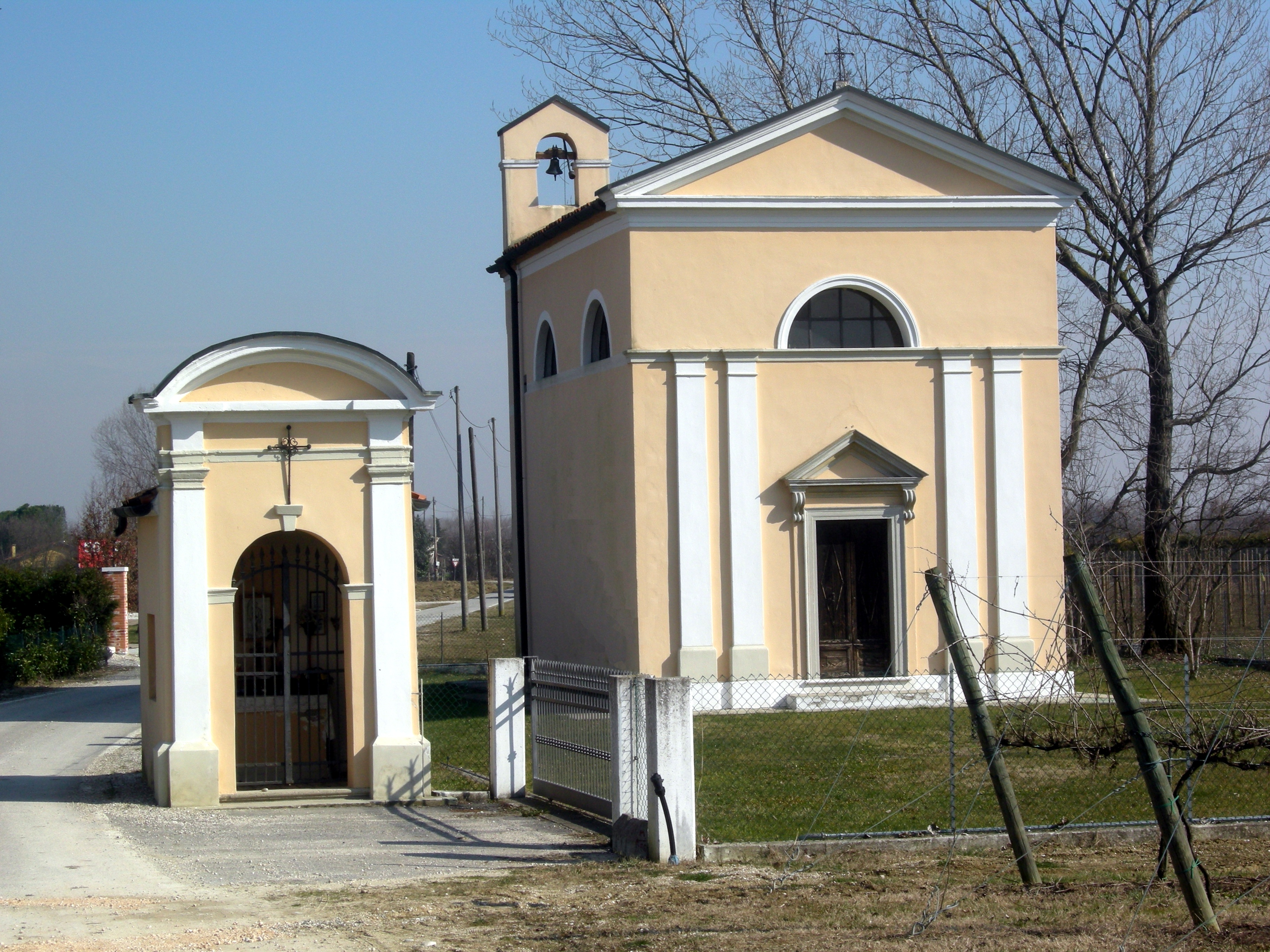
The Oratorio di Beato Enrico

Henry of Treviso (German: Heinrich von Bozen; Italian: Arrigo [Enrico] da Bolzano) (died 1315), also known as Henry of Bolzano or Blessed Rigo, was a lay pilgrim and holy man, a German from Bolzano (Bozen), who established himself in Treviso after the death of his wife and son. There he lived in extreme poverty, subsisting on alms, the excess of which he distributed among the poor.

His death was accompanied by "a popular outpouring of emotion" and he was declared the patron saint of Treviso as early as 1316, just one year after his death. In 1317 the commune tried and failed to obtain official ecclesiastical sanction for Henry’s cult. He was beatified in 1750 by Pope Benedict XIV. A Trevisan priest, Count Rambaldo degli Azzoni Avogari, published a hagiography of him in 1760.

The first novel of the second day of the Decameron by Giovanni Boccaccio cites Henry's death in Treviso and the miracles occurred around his venerated body.
