= Baybars al-Ala'i =

- Na'ib of Gaza (1307-1310); Na'ib of Homs (1311-12)
- Predecessor: Vacant
- Successor: Sanjar al-Jawli
- Born: Egypt
- Died: 1313 al-Karak, Transjordan
Names
- Rukn ad-Din Baybars al-Ala'i al-Hajib
- Dynasty: Bahri
- Religion: Islam

Rukn ad-Din Baybars al-Ala'i al-Hajib was a prominent mamluk of Bahri sultan al-Nasir Muhammad in the early 14th century. He served as the governor of a number of provinces throughout the Cairo-based Mamluk Sultanate.

An-Nasir Muhammad appointed Baybars na'ib ("governor") of Gaza in 1307–08. During his term, he restored the former Crusader castle of Gaza which had been in ruins as a result of the previous wars with the Crusaders. The marble slab containing the inscription that honored Baybars' restoration work is currently located in the Great Mosque of Gaza. His term ended in late 1309-early 1310 with the accession of al-Muzaffar Baybars to the sultanate after quietly ousting an-Nasir Muhammad.

Baybars al-Ala'i remained loyal to the latter during his exile in al-Karak and aided an-Nasir Muhammad's return to the throne by 1310. Afterward, in 1311, Baybars was appointed na'ib of Homs, serving for a brief term. Sometime between 1312 and 1313, he died in al-Karak.

== Bibliography ==
- Sharon, Moshe (2009). Handbook of Oriental Studies: The Near and Middle East. Corpus inscriptionum Arabicarum Palaestinae. BRILL. ISBN 978-90-04-17085-8.
