= John de Soules (died 1318) =

Personal details
- Died: 1318

John de Soules (or de Soulis or Soules) (died 1318). He was a prominent member of the de Soules family.

== Life ==
de Soulis joined Robert the Bruce, and was rewarded with a grant of the baronies of Kirkandrews and Torthorwald, and the lands of Brettalach, Dumfriesshire. He accompanied Edward Bruce to Ireland and was slain with him in the Battle of Dundalk on 5 October 1318. His brother William de Soulis was given John's lands and appointed Butler of Scotland.
