= Guido da Suzzara =

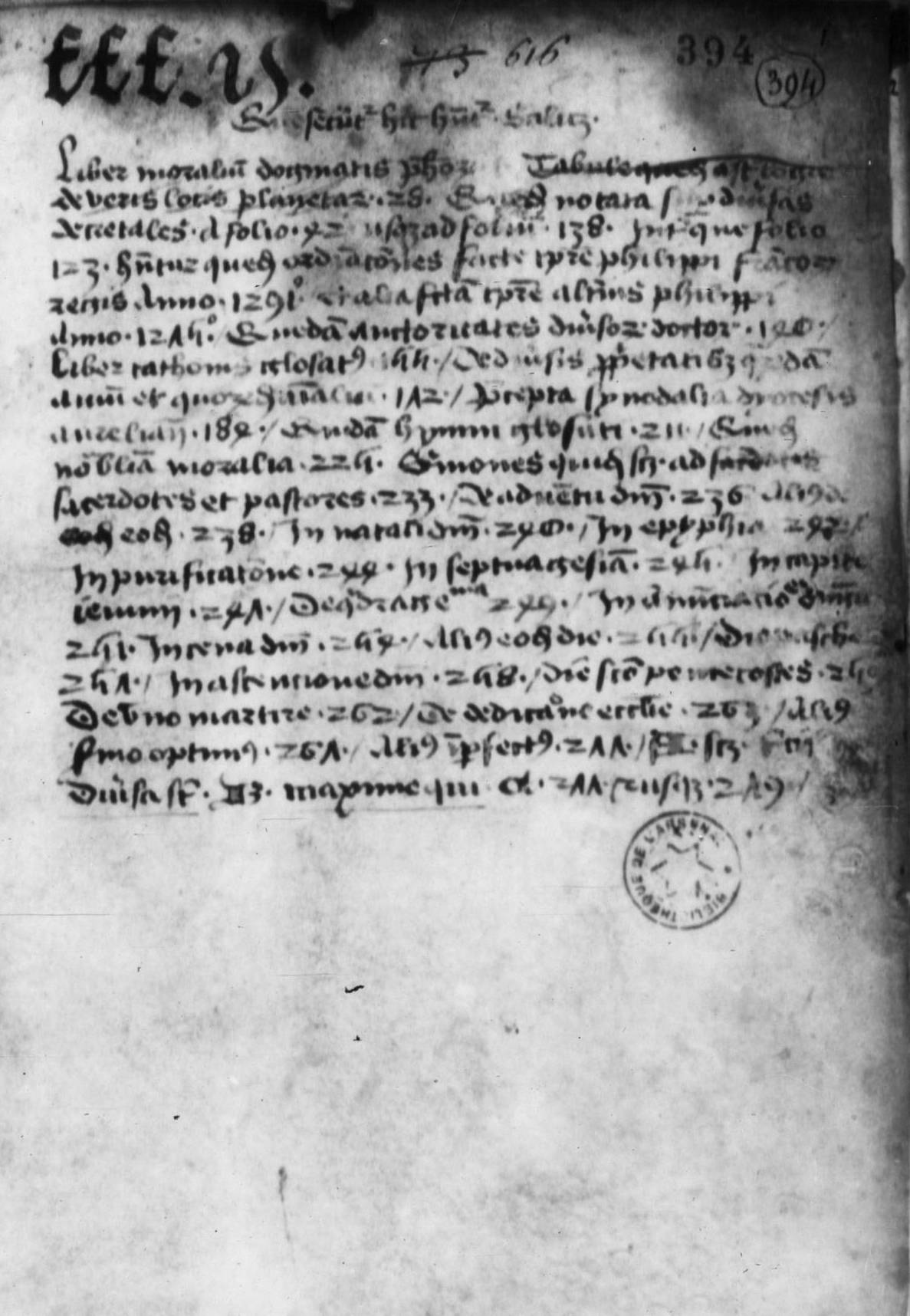
Casus Compilationis III 'Scribit dominus papa ', manuscript, 13th century (Paris, Bibliothèque de l'Arsenal, Fonds manuscrits, MS 394, ff. 77-122v.)

Guido da Suzzara (c. 1225-1292) was an Italian jurist. He was defense counsel at the trial of Conradin. Joseph Canning comments that he was important in establishing that the princeps was bound by his contracts and privileges [...].
