= Jean Pitard =

French surgeon

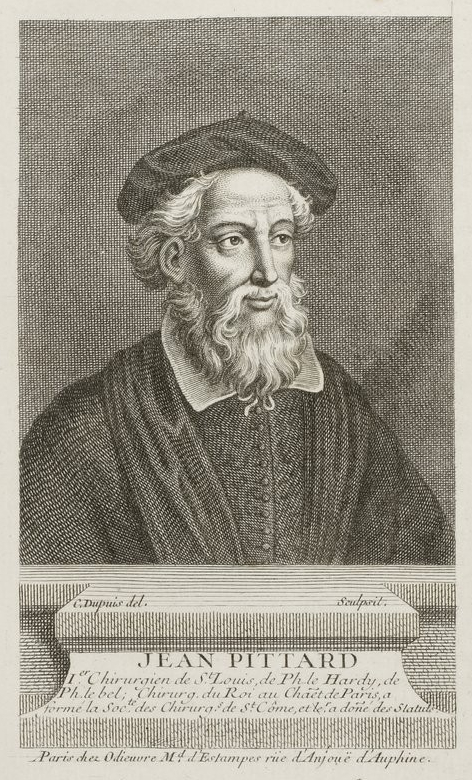

Jean Pitard (born ~1228 near Bayeux, France, died in Paris at age 87, in ~1315) was the royal surgeon to Louis IX, Philip the Bold and Philip the Fair of France. At his request, about the year 1270, Louis IX created the Fraternity of St. Cosmas and St. Damian, which defined and organized the profession of surgeons in France.

Pitard received his training as an apprentice and did not receive any university training, as a result he was not encumbered by many of the medical and anatomical theories of his contemporaries.
