= Helen of Anjou =

Helen of Anjou may refer to:

- Helen of Anjou, Queen of Serbia (c. 1235–1314), a French noblewoman who married into Serbian nobility
- Hélène of Anjou (c. 1300s–1342), a French noblewoman who married into Albanian nobility
