= 1338 =

1338 in various calendars
- Gregorian calendar: 1338; MCCCXXXVIII
- Ab urbe condita: 2091
- Armenian calendar: 787; ԹՎ ՉՁԷ
- Assyrian calendar: 6088
- Balinese saka calendar: 1259–1260
- Bengali calendar: 744–745
- Berber calendar: 2288
- English Regnal year: 11 Edw. 3 – 12 Edw. 3
- Buddhist calendar: 1882
- Burmese calendar: 700
- Byzantine calendar: 6846–6847
- Chinese calendar: 丁丑年 (Fire Ox); 4035 or 3828 — to — 戊寅年 (Earth Tiger); 4036 or 3829
- Coptic calendar: 1054–1055
- Discordian calendar: 2504
- Ethiopian calendar: 1330–1331
- Hebrew calendar: 5098–5099
- Hindu calendars
- Vikram Samvat: 1394–1395
- Shaka Samvat: 1259–1260
- Kali Yuga: 4438–4439
- Holocene calendar: 11338
- Igbo calendar: 338–339
- Iranian calendar: 716–717
- Islamic calendar: 738–739
- Japanese calendar: Shōkei 7 / Ryakuō 1 (暦応元年)
- Javanese calendar: 1250–1251
- Julian calendar: 1338; MCCCXXXVIII
- Korean calendar: 3671
- Minguo calendar: 574 before ROC 民前574年
- Nanakshahi calendar: −130
- Thai solar calendar: 1880–1881
- Tibetan calendar: མེ་མོ་གླང་ལོ་ (female Fire-Ox); 1464 or 1083 or 311 — to — ས་ཕོ་སྟག་ལོ་ (male Earth-Tiger); 1465 or 1084 or 312

Year 1338 (MCCCXXXVIII) was a common year starting on Thursday of the Julian calendar.

== Events ==
- October 5 – Hundred Years' War, English Channel naval campaign: Southampton is destroyed.

=== Date unknown ===
- Hundred Years' War: Louis IV, Holy Roman Emperor appoints Edward III of England as a vicar-general of the Holy Roman Empire. Louis supports Edward's claim to the French throne, under the terms of the Treaty of Koblenz.
- Philip VI of France besieges Guienne in Southwest France, and his navy attacks Portsmouth, England.
- Ashikaga Takauji is granted the title of shōgun by the emperor of Japan, starting the Ashikaga Shogunate.
- Nicomedia is captured by the Ottoman Empire.
- A Black Death plague strain originates near Lake Issyk-Kul in modern Kyrgyzstan, according to Syriac tombstone inscriptions and genetic material from exhumed bodies.

== Births ==
- January 13 – Chŏng Mong-ju, Korean civil minister, diplomat and scholar (d. 1392)
- January 21 – Charles V of France (d. 1380)
- February 3 – Joanna of Bourbon, queen consort of France (d. 1378)
- March 23 – Emperor Go-Kōgon of Japan, Northern Court emperor during a conflict between two imperial lines (d. 1374)
- October 5 – Alexios III of Trebizond (d. 1390)
- November 29 – Lionel of Antwerp, Duke of Clarence (d. 1368)
- date unknown
  - George Dunbar, 10th Earl of March (d. 1420)
  - Muhammad V of Granada, Sultan (d. 1391)
  - Niccolò II d'Este, Marquis of Ferrara (d. 1388)
  - Thomas de Ros, 4th Baron de Ros (d. 1383)
  - Margaret de Stafford (d. 1396)
  - Tvrtko I of Bosnia (d. 1391)

== Deaths ==
- April 8 – Stephen Gravesend, Bishop of London
- April 24 – Theodore I, Marquess of Montferrat (b. c. 1270)
- May – John Wishart, Scottish bishop
- May 5 – Prince Tsunenaga, son of the Japanese Emperor (b. 1324)
- May 23 – Alice de Warenne, Countess of Arundel, English noble (b. 1287)
- June 10 – Kitabatake Akiie, Japanese governor (b. 1318; d. in battle)
- July – Muhammad Khan, Persian monarch
- August 4 – Thomas of Brotherton, 1st Earl of Norfolk (b. 1300)
- August 17 – Nitta Yoshisada, Japanese samurai (b. 1301; d. in battle)
- August 22 – William II, Duke of Athens (b. 1312)
- December 21 – Thomas Hemenhale, Bishop of Worcester
- date unknown
  - Alfonso Fadrique, Sicilian noble
  - Awhadi Maraghai, Persian poet
  - Marino Sanuto the Elder, Venetian statesman and geographer (b. c. 1260)
  - Nitta Yoshiaki, Japanese samurai
- probable – Prince Narinaga, Japanese shōgun (b. 1325)
