= Jamal al-Din al-Watwat =

Jamāl al-Dīn Muḥammad ibn Ibrāhīm ibn Yaḥyā al-Kutubi (Arabic: جمال الدين، محمد بن إبراهيم بن يحيى بن علي المروي الأنصاري، الوراق الكتبي), known as al-Waṭwāṭ (الوطواط, 'the bat', 632-718 AH/1235-1318 CE) was a scholar and bookseller; he was born and died in Cairo.

== Works and editions ==
Al-Waṭwāṭ's works include:

- غرر الخصائص الواضحة وعرر النقائص الفاضحة
- مباهج الفكر ومناهج العبر (Mabāhij al-fikar wa manāhij al-ʿibar, 'Delightful Concepts and the Path to Precepts'). The fourth section on this work was the first original Arabic work on agriculture since Ibn Wahshiyya's tenth-century Kitāb al-Filāḥa al-Nabaṭiyya, of which al-Waṭwāṭ made extensive use.
  - Muḥammad ibn Ibrāhīm ibn Yaḥyá Jamāl al-Dīn al-Kutubī al-maʻrūf bi-al-Waṭwāṭ, مباهج الفكر ومناهج العبر : القسم النباتي [Mabāhij al-fikar wa-manāhij al-ʿibar: al-qism al-nabātī], ed. by Nāṣir Ḥusayn Aḥmad (Baghdād: al-Majmaʻ al-ʻIlmī, 2008).
