= Jean IV de Beaumont =

French military personnel

The arms of Jean de Beaumont.

Jean IV de Beaumont (died July 1318) was a Marshal of France.

De Beaumont was appointed a Marshal of France by Louis X in 1315 following the resignation of Miles de Noyers. He was appointed Governor of Artois in December the same year.
