= Zayn al-Din al-Amidi =

Kurdish scholar

- زين الدين علي بن أحمد الآمدي
- Born: Zayn al-Din 'Ali ibn Ahmad al-Amidi; 13th century Iraq
- Died: 1312; Iraq
- Occupations: Scholar, Inventor
- Era: Islamic Golden Age
- Known for: Inventing a reading system for the blind
- Notable work: System for the blind using fruit stones

Zayn al-Din 'Ali ibn Ahmad al-Amidi (زين الدين علي بن أحمد الآمدي; died 712 H/1312 AD) was a blind Kurdish scholar most known for inventing a system before Braille that allowed him to study and recognize his books. His method involved the use of fruit stones as a reading means for the blind.

Salah al-Din al-Safadi (d. 1362) in his book Nakt al-Himyan fi Nukat al-'Umyan (Emptying the pockets for anecdotes about blind people) said in respect to the originality of al-Amidi: "In addition to his knowledge, he used to trade in books. He could pick out the desired volume, touch the book and determine the number of its pages; he would touch the page and determine how many lines it had, the type of script and its color, and he knew the prices of the books".

He lived in what is now Iraq in the fourteenth century.
