= Husseini Heravi =

Persian author and poet

Hussein Husseini Heravi
- میرحسین بن عالَم حسینی هروی
- Born: 1245; Ghor
- Died: December 19, 1318 (aged 72–73); Herat
- Occupations: Persian Poet, Author and Sufi
- Notable work: Tarib al-Majalis

Mir Hussein bin A'lam Husseini Heravi (Persian: میرحسین بن عالَم حسینی هروی, 1245, Ghor - December 19, 1318, Herat) was a Persian poet, author and Sufi.

== Works ==
- Zad al-Musafirin
- Kanz al-Rumuz
- Sy-Nameh
- Diwan
- Tarib al-Majalis
- Nuzhat al'Arwah
- Sirat al-Mustaqim
- ruh al'Arwah
