= De Soules =

Norman noble family

Coat of arms of Liddesdale de Soules family. Barry of six argent and gules

De Soules (de Soulis) (Note: Also spelt Solis, Soles, Solas, Sules and Sulis.) is the surname of an old Norman noble family originating from Soulles, also known as the House of de Soules.

The family was also linked to the Scottish Crown through the marriage of William I de Soules and Ermengarde, daughter of Alan Durward by Marjorie, illegitimate daughter of Alexander II of Scotland. Their son, Nicholas II de Soules, was one of the competitors for the Crown of Scotland, upon the death of Margaret, Maid of Norway in 1290.

== Castles ==
- Liddel Castle
- Hermitage Castle
- Kilmarnock Castle
