= 1315 =

1315 in various calendars
- Gregorian calendar: 1315; MCCCXV
- Ab urbe condita: 2068
- Armenian calendar: 764; ԹՎ ՉԿԴ
- Assyrian calendar: 6065
- Balinese saka calendar: 1236–1237
- Bengali calendar: 721–722
- Berber calendar: 2265
- English Regnal year: 8 Edw. 2 – 9 Edw. 2
- Buddhist calendar: 1859
- Burmese calendar: 677
- Byzantine calendar: 6823–6824
- Chinese calendar: 甲寅年 (Wood Tiger); 4012 or 3805 — to — 乙卯年 (Wood Rabbit); 4013 or 3806
- Coptic calendar: 1031–1032
- Discordian calendar: 2481
- Ethiopian calendar: 1307–1308
- Hebrew calendar: 5075–5076
- Hindu calendars
- Vikram Samvat: 1371–1372
- Shaka Samvat: 1236–1237
- Kali Yuga: 4415–4416
- Holocene calendar: 11315
- Igbo calendar: 315–316
- Iranian calendar: 693–694
- Islamic calendar: 714–715
- Japanese calendar: Shōwa 4 (正和４年)
- Javanese calendar: 1226–1227
- Julian calendar: 1315; MCCCXV
- Korean calendar: 3648
- Minguo calendar: 597 before ROC 民前597年
- Nanakshahi calendar: −153
- Thai solar calendar: 1857–1858
- Tibetan calendar: ཤིང་ཕོ་སྟག་ལོ་ (male Wood-Tiger); 1441 or 1060 or 288 — to — ཤིང་མོ་ཡོས་ལོ་ (female Wood-Hare); 1442 or 1061 or 289

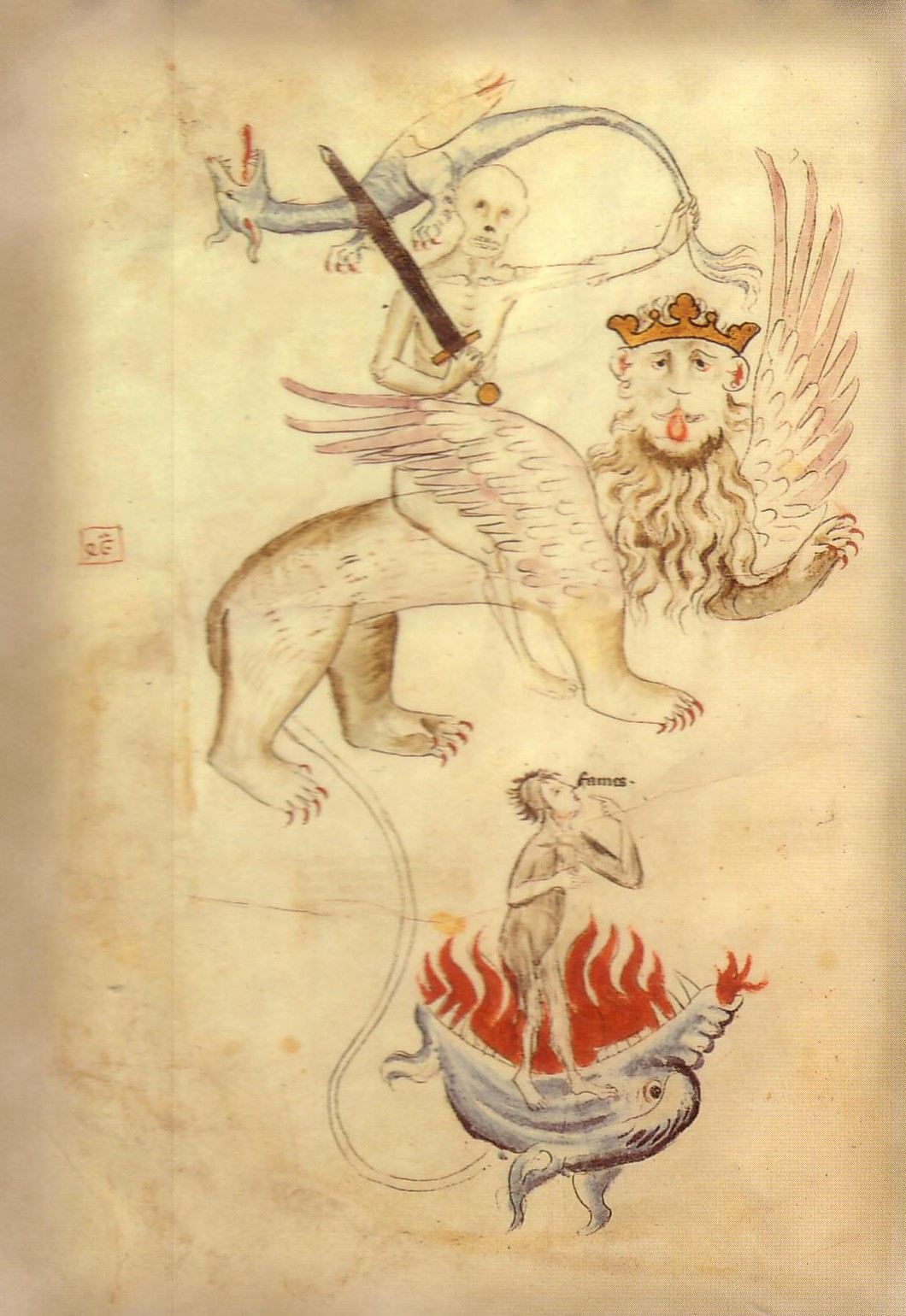
An illuminated picture of the Great Famine of 1315–1317

Year 1315 (MCCCXV) was a common year starting on Wednesday of the Julian calendar.

== Events ==
=== January – March ===
- January 2 – King Edward II of England buries his friend Piers Gaveston (executed 1312) having secured a papal absolution in one of the last acts of Pope Clement V. The burial takes place somewhere near the Kings Langley Priory in Hertfordshire, but the location of the tomb is subsequently forgotten. Gaveston had been excommunicated before his death.
- January 20 – The English Parliament is convened at Lincoln to hear the reading of the Articuli Cleri, the list of grievances against the church in England. The parliament ends on March 9.
- February 12 – Italian sculptor Tino di Camaino is commissioned by the Republic of Pisa to create a statue of the late Henry VII, Holy Roman Emperor (Enrico VII di Lussemburgo, King of Italy), to be finished in less than six months for the August 24 dedication of Henry's tomb. Camaino delivers the work by July 26.
- February 15 – John of Argyll reports to King Edward II of England that he and his army have recovered the Isle of Man and expelled the Scottish occupiers.
- March 4 (4 Dhu al-Hijjah 714 AH) – The Emir of Mecca, Abu al-Ghayth, is defeated in a battle near Mecca by his brother Humaydah ibn Abi Numayy. Wounded in battle, then captured by the enemy, Abu al-Ghayth is executed by order of his brother at Khayf Bani Shadid.
- March 8 – The Al-Shamah Mosque, in modern-day Gaza City in Palestine, is completed after being commissioned by the Mamluk Sultanate Governor of Gaza, Sanjar al-Jawli.
- March 27 – In China, Kunga Lotro Gyaltsen is installed as the Imperial Preceptor of Tibetan Buddhists, by order of the Mongol Emperor Ayurbarwada Buyantu Khan.

=== April – June ===
- April 26 – The Scottish parliament is convened at Ayr, and proclaims Edward Bruce as the legal heir to the throne to succeed if his brother, King Robert the Bruce, dies.
- April 28 – The Mamluk Sultanate army invades the Christian outpost of Malatya in Byzantium, then loots the city.
- April 30
  - Margaret of Burgundy, de jure Queen consort of France as the wife of King Louis X, dies in the Château Gaillard prison after a year of incarceration, due to her 1314 conviction for adultery in the Tour de Nesle affair. Unable to have the marriage nullified because a new Pope has not been installed, King Louis leaves Margaret imprisoned.
  - Enguerrand de Marigny, who had been the Chief Minister of France during the reign of King Philip IV of France, is hanged at the Gibbet of Montfaucon in Paris on orders of Philip's successor, King Louis X.
- May 9 – In France, Odo IV becomes the new Duke of Burgundy upon the death of his older brother, Hugh V.
- May 26 – King Edward II of England and ships with more than 6,000 troops land on the coast of Ireland at Larne to counter the Scottish invasion of Ireland led by Edward Bruce.
- June 15 – King James II of Aragon is married by proxy to Marie of Lusignan, daughter of King Hugh III of Cyprus, at a ceremony attended by James's representative at Nicosia.

=== July – September ===
- July 3 – King Louis X abolishes serfdom in the Kingdom of France.
- July 6 – In Germany, Henry II, Lord of Mecklenburg is married to Anna of Saxe-Wittenberg, daughter of Albert II, Duke of Saxony. The marriage produces an heir, Albert II, who will become Duke of Mecklenburg in 1348.
- July 22 – Siege of Carlisle: Scottish forces led by King Robert the Bruce besiege Carlisle Castle in England, but the stronghold holds out, due to a well-conducted defense organized by Andrew Harclay and the siege is abandoned by August 1.
- July 24 – Otto II, Prince of Anhalt-Aschersleben, dies without leaving any heirs, bringing an end to the Principality. His assets are seized by his cousin and creditor, Bishop Albert of Halberstadt.
- July 28 – King Louis X of France issues a charter in allowing expelled Jews to come back to France, but under strict conditions. The French Jews will be allowed to stay in the country for 12 years, after which their right to remain will be reviewed. Jewish people are required to wear armbands in public for identification, can live only in designated communities and are forbidden from usury. Through this, the Jewish community will depend upon the king for their right to protection. In December, Sultan Ismail I of Granada implements similar rules for the Jews in the Spanish kingdom, directing Jews to wear a yellow badge in public.
- July 31 – King Louis X of France mobilizes an army along the Flemish border. He prohibits the export of grain and other goods to Flanders – which proves challenging to enforce. Louis pressures officers of the Church at the borderlands, as well as King Edward II, to support his effort to prevent Spanish merchant vessels from trading with the embargoed Flemish cities.
- August 1 – After a 10-day siege of the stronghold at Carlisle, King Robert of Scotland withdraws on August 1. During the Scots' presence in Cumbria, Scottish forces under James the Black raid Copeland and plunder St Bees Priory.
- August 11 (12th day of 7th month of 4 Shōwa) – Hōjō Mototoki becomes ruler (shogun) and regent (shikken) of the Kamakura shogunate in Japan upon the death of Hōjō Hirotoki.
- August 17 – Ferdinand of Majorca completes the conquest of the Principality of Achaea, one of the crusader states that had been founded in Greece during the Fourth Crusade, by capturing the capital, Andravida.
- August 19 – King Louis X of France, nicknamed "Louis the Quarrelsome", marries the 22-year-old Clementia of Hungary, daughter of Charles Martel of Anjou (titular king of Hungary) following the death in prison of his uncrowned first wife, Margaret of Burgundy. Louis and Clementia are on August 24 crowned at Reims. Louis is the 12th Capetian ruler of France following the death nine months earlier of his father, Philip IV. After his coronation, Louis passes the throne of the Kingdom of Navarre to his younger brother, who becomes Philip II of Navarre, nicknamed "Philip the Tall".
- August 29 – Battle of Montecatini: The Pisan army (some 20,000 men) led by Uguccione della Faggiuola defeats the allied forces of Florence and Naples. During the battle, Philip I manages to escape, but his son Charles of Taranto (titled the Latin Emperor of Constantinople and his brother Peter Tempesta are killed.
- September 3 (3 Jumada II 715 AH) – Rumaythah ibn Abi Numayy, the former emir of Mecca, arrives at the court of the Mamluk Sultan of Egypt, al-Nasir Muhammad in Cairo. He receives pardon from the Sultan and seeks support against the new Emir, Humaydah ibn Abi Numayy, who had killed his brother and predecessor, Abu al-Ghayth. Al-Nasir sends Rumaythah back to Mecca with an Egyptian army. However, six days before the relief army's arrival, Humaydah pillages and burns the castle at Wadi Marr, and destroys 2,000 date palm trees.
- September 10 – The Battle of Connor is fought in County Antrim in the north of Ireland as part of the Bruce campaign in Ireland. Scottish-Irish forces commanded by Edward Bruce, brother of Scotland's King Robert the Bruce, rout the army commanded by "The Red Earl", Richard Óg de Burgh, 2nd Earl of Ulster. Those earls not captured by the Scottish army flee to Carrickfergus Castle

=== October – December ===
- October 9 – Banastre Rebellion: A group of English knights start an uprising in Lancashire and revenge themselves on Thomas of Lancaster. After the rebellion, Liverpool Castle is granted to Robert de Holland.
- November 15 – Battle of Morgarten: The Swiss defeat Leopold of Austria on the shore of the Ägerisee, ensuring independence for the Swiss Confederation.
- November 17 – The marriage of King James II of Aragon to Marie of Lusignan is performed in person after Marie has traveled to Spain, with the ceremony taking place at Girona.
- December 9 – In Switzerland, the Pact of Brunnen is signed between leaders of the cantons of Uri, Schwyz and Unterwalden at the city of Brunnen in Schwyz as a mutual defense pact against an invasion by Austria.
- December 13
  - Gaston II of Foix-Béarn becomes the new French representative to rule the Co-principality of Andorra after the death of his father, Gaston I.
  - (3 Jumada II 715 AH) Rumaythah ibn Abi Numayy arrives at Mecca with an Egyptian Army, led by the emirs Najm al-Din Damurkhan ibn Qaraman and Sayf al-Din Taydamur al-Jamadar, then spends two weeks in making plans to drive out the Emir Humaydah ibn Abi Numayy. They loot Humaydah's castle at al-Khalf wal-Khulayf, plunder the wealth inside and capture his 12-year-old son, but Humaydah himself escapes to Iraq.

== By topic ==
=== Natural disasters ===
- Spring – Great Famine of 1315–1317: A famine and pestilence sweeps over Europe, and exacts so frightful a toll of human life that the phenomenon is to be regarded as one of the most impressive features of the period. It covers almost the whole of Northern Europe; the current territory of Ireland, England, France, Netherlands, Germany and Poland. Heavy rains and unseasonably cold weather, the ensuing harvest failures and death of livestock from starvation, and the sharp rise in food prices cause an acute shortage of food that will last for two years. The famine causes millions of deaths (according to estimates, around 10 to 25% of the urban population dies). On August 10, King Edward II of England witnesses its extent in his realm when he and his entourage stop at St Albans and find bread and other food unavailable.

=== Cities and towns ===
- Cairo, capital of the Mamluk Sultanate becomes the largest city in the world, taking the lead from Hangzhou in Mongolian China (approximate date).
- Siegfried II, bishop of Hildesheim, provides Dassel in Lower Saxony, Germany with city rights.
- In the Netherlands, Vlissingen (Anglicized to "Flushing" later) is granted city rights.

== Births ==
- January 20 – Yi Ja-chun, Korean nobleman and general (d. 1361)
- February 22 – Chunghye of Goryeo, Korean crown prince and king (d. 1344)
- April 5 – King James III of Majorca, who will be nicknamed "James the Unfortunate".(d. 1349)
- April 14 – Emir Muhammad IV of Granada, Nasrid ruler (sultan) of the Emirate of Granada, now part of Spain. (d. 1333)
- May 4 – John Segrave, English nobleman and landowner (d. 1353)
- May 20 – Bonne of Luxembourg, queen consort of France (d. 1349)
- date unknown
  - Albert IV, German nobleman (House of Ascania) (d. 1343)
  - Federico di Pagana, Genoese nobleman and doge (d. 1406)
  - The Empress Gi, Chinese concubine and empress consort as wife of Emperor Huizong of the Yuan dynasty (d. 1369)
  - James of Piedmont, Italian nobleman (House of Savoy) (d. 1367)
  - Joanna of Hainault, French noblewoman and regent (d. 1374)
  - Johann Hiltalinger, Swiss bishop, theologian and writer (d. 1392)
  - John FitzWalter, English nobleman, knight and landowner (d. 1361)
  - Kujō Michinori, Japanese nobleman (kugyō) and regent (d. 1349)
  - Louis V, German nobleman, knight, prince and co-ruler (d. 1361)
  - Marie de Bourbon, Latin princess (House of Bourbon) (d. 1387)
  - Pierre d'Orgemont, French politician and chancellor (d. 1389)
  - Raoul II of Brienne, French nobleman and constable (d. 1350)
  - Roger Beauchamp, English nobleman and chamberlain (d. 1380)

== Deaths ==
- January 15 – Gyeguk, Korean queen consort of Goryeo (b. 1285)
- March 10 – Agnes Blannbekin, Austrian mystic and writer (b. 1244)
- April 30
  - Enguerrand de Marigny, French Grand Chamberlain (b. 1260)
  - Margaret of Burgundy, queen consort of France (b. 1290)
- May 1 – Margaret of Brandenburg, German noblewoman (b. 1270)
- May 9 – Hugh V, French nobleman (House of Burgundy) (b. 1294)
- June 27 – Mieszko I, Polish nobleman and knight (House of Piast)
- July 24 – Otto II, German nobleman and prince (House of Ascania)
- August 12 – Guy de Beauchamp, English nobleman and magnate
- August 18 – Hōjō Hirotoki, Japanese nobleman and regent (b. 1279)
- August 29 – (Killed in the Battle of Montecatini)
  - Charles of Taranto, Italian nobleman (House of Anjou) (b. 1296)
  - Peter Tempesta, nicknamed "Storm", Italian nobleman and knight (b. 1291)
- August 31 – Andrea Dotti, Italian nobleman and preacher (b. 1256)
- November 24 – Fulk FitzWarin, English nobleman and landowner
- December 6 – William Greenfield, English rector and archbishop
- December 13 – Gaston I, Occitan nobleman and knight (b. 1287)
- date unknown
  - Abu al-Ghayth ibn Abi Numayy, Hasanid ruler of Mecca
  - Adolph VI, German nobleman, knight and ruler (b. 1256)
  - Esclaramunda of Foix, queen consort of Majorca (b. 1250)
  - Henry of Treviso, German hermit, pilgrim and saint (b. 1250)
  - Ibn al-Raqqam, Andalusian astronomer and jurist (b. 1250)
  - Jean Pitard, French physician, surgeon and writer (b. 1228)
  - John I of Chalon-Arlay, French nobleman (House of Chalon-Arlay) (b. 1258)
  - Juan Núñez II de Lara, Spanish nobleman (House of Lara) (b. 1276)
  - Lanfranc of Milan, Italian cleric, surgeon and writer (b. 1250)
  - Lu Zhi, Chinese official, politician, poet and writer (b. 1243)
  - Margaret of Villehardouin, Latin noblewoman and princess
  - Nichigen, Japanese Buddhist monk and disciple (b. 1262)
  - Robert FitzPayne, English nobleman, knight and governor
  - Stephen Ákos, Hungarian nobleman and oligarch (b. 1260)
