= Rumaythah =

Rumaythah, Rumaytha or Rumaitha (Arabic: رُمَيْثَة) is an Arabic given name historically used by both females and males, now chiefly feminine. A diminutive of rimth or ramth (رمث), meaning 'saxaul', it was the name of two female companions of Muhammad. It is found in the nasab (patronymic) of several historical figures.

Notable people with the name include:

== Given name ==
- Rumaitha Al Busaidi, Omani activist, radio presenter, marine scientist, entrepreneur and footballer
- Rumaythah ibn Muhammad (fl. 1416), Emir of Mecca
- Rumaythah ibn Abi Numayy (fl. from 1301, died 1346), Emir of Mecca

== Last name ==
- Ajlan ibn Rumaythah (c. 1307–1375), Emir of Mecca
- Mughamis ibn Rumaythah (fl. 1347–1349), Emir of Mecca
- Sanad ibn Rumaythah (fl. 1359–1360), Emir of Mecca
- Thaqabah ibn Rumaythah (fl. 1344–1361), Emir of Mecca

== See also ==
- Romaisa
- Rümeysa
