= August 29 =

August 29 this year in various calendars
- Saturday, 29 August 2026
Akan	Nkyimemene
Armenian	10 Hoṙi 1476
Aztec	Atemoztli 11, 11 Quiyahuitl
Babylonian	15 Abu, 2337 SE
Balinese pawukon	Menga, Kajeng, Sri, Pon, Urukung, Saniscara of Matal, Sri, Dadi, Manusa
Bengali	14 Bhadro, BS 1433
Chinese	Yin Wood Pig・Girl Mansion; Fire Horse Year, Month 7, Day 17 (Chushu, 9 days until Bailu)
Common Era	29 August 2026 CE
Coptic	23 Mesori, AM 1742
Egyptian	15 Tybi, 2775 NE
Ethiopian	23 Naḥasē, 2018 Amätä Məhrät
French Republican	Décade II, Duodi de Fructidor de l'Année 234 de la République
Gregorian	29 August, AD 2026
Hebrew	16 Elul, AM 5786
Hindu	Pūrvabhādrapada・Sukarman; Solar: 13 Bhādrapada, 1948 SE; Lunisolar: Pratipada, Kṛishna pakṣa of Śrāvaṇa, 2083 VE; Rāudra・5127 KY・1,872,816
Icelandic	Laugardagur, 5 Tvímánuður 2026
Islamic	15 Rabi' al-awwal, AH 1448 (using tabular method)
ISO week date	2026-W35-6
Japanese	17 Fumizuki, Reiwa 8 (Shosho, 9 days until Hakuro)
Julian	16 August, AD 2026 (AM 7534)
Julian day	2461282
Korean	17 Wonsungidal, 4359 DE
Maya	13.0.13.15.19; 12 Mol, 11 Cauac
Roman	ante diem XVII Kalendas Septembres, MMDCCLXXIX AUC
Solar Hijri	7 Shahrivar, SH 1405
Tibetan	16 gro bzhin, me pho rta 2153 or 1772 or 1000

<<	August					>>
Su	Mo	Tu	We	Th	Fr	Sa
						1
2	3	4	5	6	7	8
9	10	11	12	13	14	15
16	17	18	19	20	21	22
23	24	25	26	27	28	29
30	31
2026

August 29 in recent years
2026 (Saturday)
2025 (Friday)
2024 (Thursday)
2023 (Tuesday)
2022 (Monday)
2021 (Sunday)
2020 (Saturday)
2019 (Thursday)
2018 (Wednesday)
2017 (Tuesday)

August 29 is the 241st day of the year (242nd in leap years) in the Gregorian calendar; 124 days remain until the end of the year.

== Events ==
=== Pre-1600 ===
- 708 – Copper coins are minted in Japan for the first time (Traditional Japanese date: August 10, 708).
- 870 – The city of Melite surrenders to an Aghlabid army following a siege, putting an end to Byzantine Malta.
- 1009 – Mainz Cathedral suffers extensive damage from a fire, which destroys the building on the day of its inauguration.
- 1167 – King Amalric of Jerusalem marries Byzantine princess Maria Komnene in the cathedral of Tyre.
- 1219 – The Battle of Fariskur occurs during the Fifth Crusade.
- 1261 – Pope Urban IV succeeds Pope Alexander IV, becoming the 182nd pope.
- 1315 – Battle of Montecatini: The army of the Republic of Pisa, commanded by Uguccione della Faggiuola, wins a decisive victory against the joint forces of the Kingdom of Naples and the Republic of Florence despite being outnumbered.
- 1350 – Battle of Winchelsea (or Les Espagnols sur Mer): The English naval fleet under King Edward III defeats a Castilian fleet of 40 ships.
- 1393 – Timur takes Baghdad from Sultan Ahmad Jalayir for the first time.
- 1475 – Hundred Years' War: The Treaty of Picquigny formally ends the war between the kingdoms of France and England.
- 1484 – Pope Innocent VIII succeeds Pope Sixtus IV.
- 1498 – Vasco da Gama decides to depart Calicut and return to the Kingdom of Portugal.
- 1521 – The Ottoman Turks capture Nándorfehérvár (Belgrade).
- 1526 – Battle of Mohács: The Ottoman Turks led by Suleiman the Magnificent defeat and kill the last Jagiellonian king of Hungary and Bohemia.
- 1541 – The Ottoman Turks capture Buda, the capital of the Hungarian Kingdom.
- 1588 – Toyotomi Hideyoshi issues a nationwide sword hunting ordinance, disarming the peasantry so as to firmly separate the samurai and commoner classes, prevent peasant uprisings, and further centralise his own power.

=== 1601–1900 ===
- 1604 – The Guru Granth Sahib is fully compiled and completed by Guru Arjan.
- 1728 – The city of Nuuk in Greenland is founded as the fort of Godt-Haab by the royal governor Claus Paarss.
- 1741 – The eruption of Oshima–Ōshima and the Kampo tsunami: At least 2,000 people along the Japanese coast drown in a tsunami caused by the eruption of Oshima.
- 1756 – Frederick the Great attacks Saxony, beginning the Seven Years' War in Europe.
- 1758 – The Treaty of Easton establishes the first American Indian reservation, at Indian Mills, New Jersey, for the Lenape.
- 1778 – American Revolutionary War: British and American forces battle indecisively at the Battle of Rhode Island.
- 1779 – American Revolutionary War: American forces battle and defeat the British and Iroquois forces at the Battle of Newtown.
- 1786 – Shays' Rebellion, an armed uprising of Massachusetts farmers, begins in response to high debt and tax burdens.
- 1807 – British troops under Sir Arthur Wellesley defeat a Danish militia outside Copenhagen in the Battle of Køge.
- 1825 – Portuguese and Brazilian diplomats sign the Treaty of Rio de Janeiro, which has Portugal recognise Brazilian independence, formally ending the Brazilian War of Independence. The treaty will be ratified by the King of Portugal three months later.
- 1831 – Michael Faraday discovers electromagnetic induction.
- 1842 – Treaty of Nanking signing ends the First Opium War.
- 1861 – American Civil War: The Battle of Hatteras Inlet Batteries gives Federal forces control of Pamlico Sound.
- 1869 – The Mount Washington Cog Railway opens, making it the world's first mountain-climbing rack railway.
- 1871 – Emperor Meiji orders the abolition of the han system and the establishment of prefectures as local centers of administration. (Traditional Japanese date: July 14, 1871).
- 1885 – Gottlieb Daimler patents the world's first motorcycle with an internal combustion engine, the Reitwagen.
- 1898 – The Goodyear tire company is founded in Akron, Ohio.

=== 1901–present ===
- 1903 – The Slava, the last of the five Borodino-class battleships, is launched.
- 1907 – The Quebec Bridge collapses during construction, killing 75 workers.
- 1910 – The Japan–Korea Treaty of 1910, also known as the Japan–Korea Annexation Treaty, becomes effective, officially starting the period of Japanese rule in Korea.
- 1911 – Ishi, considered the last Native American to make contact with European Americans, emerges from the wilderness of northeastern California.
- 1911 – The Canadian Naval Service becomes the Royal Canadian Navy.
- 1912 – A typhoon strikes China, killing at least 50,000 people.
- 1914 – World War I: Start of the Battle of St. Quentin in which the French Fifth Army counter-attacked the invading Germans at Saint-Quentin, Aisne.
- 1915 – US Navy salvage divers raise F-4, the first U.S. submarine sunk in an accident.
- 1916 – The United States passes the Philippine Autonomy Act.
- 1918 – World War I: Bapaume taken by the New Zealand Division in the Hundred Days Offensive.
- 1930 – The last 36 remaining inhabitants of St Kilda are voluntarily evacuated to other parts of Scotland.
- 1941 – World War II: Tallinn, the capital of Estonia, is occupied by Nazi Germany following an occupation by the Soviet Union.
- 1943 – World War II: German-occupied Denmark scuttles most of its navy; Germany dissolves the Danish government.
- 1944 – World War II: Slovak National Uprising takes place as 60,000 Slovak troops turn against the Nazis.
- 1948 – Northwest Airlines Flight 421 crashes in Fountain City, Wisconsin, killing all 37 aboard.
- 1949 – Soviet atomic bomb project: The Soviet Union tests its first atomic bomb, known as First Lightning or Joe 1, at Semipalatinsk, Kazakhstan.
- 1950 – Korean War: British Commonwealth Forces Korea arrives to bolster the US presence.
- 1952 – American experimental composer John Cage's 4’33” premieres at Maverick Concert Hall, played by American pianist David Tudor.
- 1958 – United States Air Force Academy opens in Colorado Springs, Colorado.
- 1960 – Air France Flight 343 crashes on approach to Yoff Airport in Senegal, killing all 63 aboard.
- 1965 – The Gemini V spacecraft returns to Earth, landing in the Atlantic Ocean.
- 1966 – The Beatles perform their last concert before paying fans at Candlestick Park in San Francisco.
- 1966 – Leading Egyptian thinker Sayyid Qutb is executed for plotting the assassination of President Gamal Abdel Nasser.
- 1970 – Chicano Moratorium against the Vietnam War, East Los Angeles, California. Police riot kills three people, including journalist Rubén Salazar.
- 1975 – El Tacnazo: Francisco Morales Bermúdez, Peruvian Prime Minister carries out a coup d'état in the city of Tacna, forcing the sitting President of Peru, Juan Velasco Alvarado, to resign and assuming his place as the new President.
- 1982 – Meitnerium, a synthetic chemical element with the atomic number 109, is first synthesized at the Gesellschaft für Schwerionenforschung in Darmstadt, Germany.
- 1987 – Odaeyang mass suicide: Thirty-three individuals linked to a religious cult are found dead in the attic of a cafeteria in Yongin, South Korea. Investigators attribute their deaths to a murder–suicide pact.
- 1991 – Supreme Soviet of the Soviet Union suspends all activities of the Soviet Communist Party.
- 1991 – Libero Grassi, an Italian businessman from Palermo, is killed by the Sicilian Mafia after taking a solitary stand against their extortion demands.
- 1996 – Vnukovo Airlines Flight 2801, a Tupolev Tu-154, crashes into a mountain on the Arctic island of Spitsbergen, killing all 141 aboard.
- 1997 – Netflix is launched as an internet DVD rental service.
- 1997 – At least 98 villagers are killed by the Armed Islamic Group of Algeria GIA in the Rais massacre, Algeria.
- 1998 – Eighty people are killed when Cubana de Aviación Flight 389 crashes during a rejected takeoff from the Old Mariscal Sucre International Airport in Quito, Ecuador.
- 2001 – Four people are killed when Binter Mediterráneo Flight 8261 crashes into the N-340 highway near Málaga Airport.
- 2003 – Sayed Ayatollah Mohammed Baqir al-Hakim, the Shia Muslim leader in Iraq, is assassinated in a terrorist bombing, along with nearly 100 worshippers as they leave a mosque in Najaf.
- 2005 – Hurricane Katrina devastates much of the U.S. Gulf Coast from Louisiana to the Florida Panhandle, killing up to 1,392 people and causing $125 billion in damage.
- 2012 – At least 26 Chinese miners are killed and 21 missing after a blast in the Xiaojiawan coal mine, located at Panzhihua, Sichuan Province.
- 2012 – The XIV Paralympic Games open in London, England, United Kingdom.
- 2020 – 2020 Women's FA Community Shield.
- 2022 – Russo-Ukrainian war: Ukraine begins its southern counteroffensive in the Kherson Oblast, eventually culminating in the liberation of the city of Kherson.

== Births ==
=== Pre-1600 ===
- 979 – Otto (or Eudes), French nobleman (died 1045)
- 1321 – John of Artois, French nobleman (died 1387)
- 1347 – John Hastings, 2nd Earl of Pembroke, English nobleman and soldier (died 1375)
- 1434 – Janus Pannonius, Hungarian bishop and poet (died 1472)
- 1514 – García Álvarez de Toledo, 4th Marquis of Villafranca, Spanish noble and admiral (died 1577)
- 1534 – Nicholas Pieck, Dutch Franciscan friar and martyr (died 1572)
- 1597 – Henry Gage, Royalist officer in the English Civil War (died 1645)

=== 1601–1900 ===
- 1619 – Jean-Baptiste Colbert, French economist and politician, Controller-General of Finances (died 1683)
- 1628 – John Granville, 1st Earl of Bath, English soldier and politician, Lord Lieutenant of Ireland (died 1701)
- 1632 – John Locke, English physician and philosopher (died 1704)
- 1724 – Giovanni Battista Casti, Italian poet and author (died 1803)
- 1725 – Charles Townshend, English politician, Chancellor of the Exchequer (died 1767)
- 1728 – Maria Anna Sophia of Saxony, electress of Bavaria (died 1797)
- 1756 – Jan Śniadecki, Polish mathematician and astronomer (died 1830)
- 1756 – Count Heinrich von Bellegarde, Austrian general and politician (died 1845)
- 1772 – James Finlayson, Scottish Quaker (died 1852)
- 1777 – Hyacinth, Russian religious leader, founded Sinology (died 1853)
- 1780 – Jean-Auguste-Dominique Ingres, French painter and illustrator (died 1867)
- 1792 – Charles Grandison Finney, American minister and author (died 1875)
- 1805 – Frederick Denison Maurice, English priest, theologian, and author (died 1872)
- 1809 – Oliver Wendell Holmes Sr., American physician and author (died 1894)
- 1810 – Juan Bautista Alberdi, Argentine theorist and diplomat (died 1884)
- 1813 – Henry Bergh, American activist, founded the ASPCA (died 1888)
- 1842 – Alfred Shaw, English cricketer, rugby player, and umpire (died 1907)
- 1843 – David B. Hill, American lawyer and politician, 29th Governor of New York (died 1910)
- 1844 – Edward Carpenter, English anthologist and poet (died 1929)
- 1854 – William C. White, American Seventh-day Adventist Church minister (died 1937)
- 1857 – Sandford Schultz, English cricketer (died 1937)
- 1861 – Byron G. Harlan, American singer (died 1936)
- 1862 – Andrew Fisher, Scottish-Australian politician and diplomat, 5th Prime Minister of Australia (died 1928)
- 1862 – Maurice Maeterlinck, Belgian poet and playwright, Nobel Prize laureate (died 1949)
- 1871 – Albert François Lebrun, French engineer and politician, 15th President of France (died 1950)
- 1875 – Leonardo De Lorenzo, Italian flute player and educator (died 1962)
- 1876 – Charles F. Kettering, American engineer and businessman, founded Delco Electronics (died 1958)
- 1876 – Kim Koo, South Korean politician, 6th President of The Provisional Government of the Republic of Korea (died 1949)
- 1879 – Han Yong-un, Korean independence activist, reformer, and poet (died 1944)
- 1887 – Jivraj Narayan Mehta, Indian physicians and politician, 1st Chief Minister of Gujarat (died 1978)
- 1888 – Salme Dutt, Estonian-English politician (died 1964)
- 1890 – Peder Furubotn, Norwegian Communist and anti-Nazi Resistance leader (died 1975)
- 1891 – Marquis James, American journalist and author (died 1955)
- 1898 – Preston Sturges, American director and producer (died 1959)

=== 1901–present ===
- 1901 – Aurèle Joliat, Canadian ice hockey player and referee (died 1986)
- 1904 – Werner Forssmann, German physician and academic, Nobel Prize laureate (died 1979)
- 1905 – Dhyan Chand, Indian field hockey player (died 1979)
- 1905 – Arndt Pekurinen, Finnish activist (died 1941)
- 1910 – Vivien Thomas, American surgeon and academic (died 1985)
- 1911 – John Charnley, British orthopedic surgeon (died 1982)
- 1912 – Sohn Kee-chung, South Korean runner (died 2002)
- 1912 – Barry Sullivan, American actor (died 1994)
- 1912 – Wolfgang Suschitzky, Austrian-English cinematographer and photographer (died 2016)
- 1913 – Len Butterfield, New Zealand cricketer (died 1999)
- 1913 – Jackie Mitchell, American baseball pitcher (died 1987)
- 1915 – Ingrid Bergman, Swedish actress (died 1982)
- 1915 – Nathan Pritikin, American nutritionist and author (died 1985)
- 1916 – Luther Davis, American playwright and screenwriter (died 2008)
- 1917 – Isabel Sanford, American actress (died 2004)
- 1920 – Otis Boykin, American inventor and engineer (died 1982)
- 1920 – Charlie Parker, American saxophonist and composer (died 1955)
- 1920 – Herb Simpson, American baseball player (died 2015)
- 1921 – Iris Apfel, American businesswoman, interior designer, and philanthropist (died 2024)
- 1922 – Arthur Anderson, American actor (died 2016)
- 1922 – Richard Blackwell, American actor, fashion designer, and critic (died 2008)
- 1922 – John Edward Williams, American author and educator (died 1994)
- 1923 – Richard Attenborough, English actor, director, and producer (died 2014)
- 1924 – Dinah Washington, American singer and pianist (died 1963)
- 1925 – Annette Saint-Pierre, Canadian educator, writer and publisher (died 2026)
- 1926 – Hélène Ahrweiler, Greek historian and academic (died 2026)
- 1926 – René Depestre, Haitian writer
- 1926 – Donn Fendler, American author and speaker (died 2016)
- 1926 – Betty Lynn, American actress (died 2021)
- 1927 – Jimmy C. Newman, American singer-songwriter and guitarist (died 2014)
- 1927 – Marion Williams, American gospel singer (Stars of Faith) (died 1994)
- 1928 – Herbert Meier, Swiss author and translator (died 2018)
- 1929 – Thom Gunn, English-American poet and academic (died 2004)
- 1930 – Jacques Bouchard, Canadian businessman (died 2006)
- 1930 – Carlos Loyzaga, Filipino basketball player and coach (died 2016)
- 1931 – Stelios Kazantzidis, Greek singer and guitarist (died 2001)
- 1931 – Lise Payette, Canadian journalist and politician (died 2018)
- 1933 – Sorel Etrog, Romanian-Canadian sculptor, painter, and illustrator (died 2014)
- 1933 – Arnold Koller, Swiss politician
- 1934 – Dimitris Papamichael, Greek actor and director (died 2004)
- 1935 – Hugo Brandt Corstius, Dutch linguist and author (died 2014)
- 1935 – William Friedkin, American director, producer, and screenwriter (died 2023)
- 1935 – László Garai, Hungarian psychologist and scholar (died 2019)
- 1936 – John McCain, American captain and politician (died 2018)
- 1937 – James Florio, American commander, lawyer, and politician, 49th Governor of New Jersey (died 2022)
- 1938 – Elliott Gould, American actor and producer
- 1938 – Angela Huth, English journalist and author
- 1938 – Christian Müller, German footballer and manager
- 1938 – Robert Rubin, American lawyer and politician, 70th United States Secretary of the Treasury
- 1939 – Jolán Kleiber-Kontsek, Hungarian discus thrower and shot putter (died 2022)
- 1939 – Joel Schumacher, American director, producer, and screenwriter (died 2020)
- 1940 – James Brady, American politician and activist, 15th White House Press Secretary (died 2014)
- 1940 – Gary Gabelich, American race car driver (died 1984)
- 1941 – Robin Leach, English journalist and television host (died 2018)
- 1942 – James Glennon, American cinematographer (died 2006)
- 1942 – Gottfried John, German actor (died 2014)
- 1942 – Sterling Morrison, American singer and guitarist (died 1995)
- 1943 – Mohamed Amin, Kenyan photographer and journalist (died 1996)
- 1943 – Dick Halligan, American pianist and composer (died 2022)
- 1943 – Arthur B. McDonald, Canadian astrophysicist and academic, Nobel Prize laureate
- 1945 – Chris Copping, English singer-songwriter and guitarist
- 1945 – Wyomia Tyus, American sprinter
- 1946 – Bob Beamon, American long jumper
- 1946 – Francine D. Blau, American economist and academic
- 1946 – Demetris Christofias, Cypriot businessman and politician, 6th President of Cyprus (died 2019)
- 1946 – Warren Jabali, American basketball player (died 2012)
- 1946 – Giorgio Orsoni, Italian lawyer and politician, 17th Mayor of Venice
- 1947 – Temple Grandin, American ethologist, academic, and author
- 1947 – James Hunt, English race car driver and sportscaster (died 1993)
- 1948 – Robert S. Langer, American chemical engineer, entrepreneur, and academic
- 1949 – Stan Hansen, American wrestler and actor
- 1949 – Darnell Hillman, American basketball player
- 1950 – Doug DeCinces, American baseball player
- 1950 – Frank Henenlotter, American director and screenwriter
- 1950 – Dave Reichert, American soldier and politician
- 1950 – Aki Yashiro, Japanese singer (died 2023)
- 1951 – Geoff Whitehorn, English singer-songwriter and guitarist
- 1952 – Karen Hesse, American author and poet
- 1952 – Dave Malone, American singer-songwriter and guitarist
- 1952 – Don Schlitz, American Hall of Fame country music songwriter (died 2026)
- 1952 – Deborah Van Valkenburgh, American actress
- 1953 – David Boaz, American businessman and author
- 1953 – Richard Harding, English rugby union player
- 1953 – James Quesada, Nicaraguan-American anthropologist and academic
- 1954 – Michael P. Kube-McDowell, American journalist, author, and academic
- 1955 – Diamanda Galás, American singer-songwriter and pianist
- 1955 – Jack Lew, American lawyer and politician, 25th White House Chief of Staff
- 1956 – Mark Morris, American dancer and choreographer
- 1956 – Eddie Murray, American football player
- 1956 – Charalambos Xanthopoulos, Greek footballer
- 1956 – Steve Yarbrough, American novelist and short story writer
- 1957 – Jerry D. Bailey, American jockey and sportscaster
- 1957 – Grzegorz Ciechowski, Polish singer-songwriter, film music composer (died 2001)
- 1958 – Lenny Henry, English comedian, actor, and screenwriter
- 1958 – Michael Jackson, American singer-songwriter, producer, dancer, and actor (died 2009)
- 1959 – Rebecca De Mornay, American actress
- 1959 – Ramón Díaz, Argentine footballer and manager
- 1959 – Ray Elgaard, Canadian football player
- 1959 – Chris Hadfield, Canadian colonel, pilot, and astronaut
- 1959 – Eddi Reader, Scottish singer-songwriter, guitarist, and producer
- 1959 – Timothy Shriver, American businessman and activist
- 1959 – Stephen Wolfram, English-American physicist and mathematician
- 1959 – Nagarjuna, Indian film actor, Producer and Businessman
- 1960 – Todd English, American chef and author
- 1960 – Tony MacAlpine, American guitarist, songwriter, and producer
- 1961 – Carsten Fischer, German field hockey player
- 1961 – Rodney McCray, American basketball player
- 1962 – Carl Banks, American football player and sportscaster
- 1962 – Hiroki Kikuta, Japanese game designer and composer
- 1962 – Ian James Corlett, Canadian voice actor, writer, producer, and author
- 1962 – Simon Thurley, English historian and academic
- 1962 – Richard Angelo, American serial killer and poisoner
- 1963 – Elizabeth Fraser, Scottish singer-songwriter
- 1964 – Perri "Pebbles" Reid, American dance-pop and urban contemporary singer-songwriter
- 1964 – Zisis Tsekos, Greek footballer
- 1965 – Me'Shell Ndegéocello, American singer-songwriter
- 1965 – Will Perdue, American basketball player and sportscaster
- 1965 – Geir-Inge Sivertsen, Norwegian politician and engineer, Norwegian Minister of Fisheries and Seafood
- 1966 – Jörn Großkopf, German footballer and manager
- 1967 – Neil Gorsuch, American lawyer and jurist, Associate Justice of the Supreme Court of the United States
- 1967 – Anton Newcombe, American singer-songwriter and guitarist
- 1968 – Meshell Ndegeocello, German-American singer-songwriter
- 1969 – Joe Swail, Northern Irish snooker player
- 1969 – Jennifer Crittenden, American screenwriter and producer
- 1969 – Lucero, Mexican singer, songwriter, actress, and television host
- 1971 – Henry Blanco, Venezuelan baseball player and coach
- 1971 – Alex Griffin, English bass player
- 1971 – Carla Gugino, American actress
- 1972 – Amanda Marshall, Canadian singer-songwriter
- 1972 – Bae Yong-joon, South Korean actor
- 1973 – Vincent Cavanagh, English singer and guitarist
- 1973 – Olivier Jacque, French motorcycle racer
- 1974 – Kumi Tanioka, Japanese keyboard player and composer
- 1975 – Dante Basco, American actor
- 1975 – Kyle Cook, American singer-songwriter and guitarist
- 1976 – Stephen Carr, Irish footballer
- 1976 – Phil Harvey, English manager
- 1976 – Kevin Kaesviharn, American football player
- 1976 – Georgios Kalaitzis, Greek basketball player
- 1976 – Pablo Mastroeni, Argentine-American soccer player and manager
- 1976 – Jon Dahl Tomasson, Danish footballer and manager
- 1977 – Cayetano, Greek DJ and producer
- 1977 – Devean George, American basketball player
- 1977 – John Hensley, American actor
- 1977 – John Patrick O'Brien, American soccer player
- 1977 – Roy Oswalt, American baseball player
- 1977 – Charlie Pickering, Australian comedian and radio host
- 1977 – Aaron Rowand, American baseball player and sportscaster
- 1978 – Volkan Arslan, German-Turkish footballer
- 1978 – Celestine Babayaro, Nigerian footballer
- 1979 – Stijn Devolder, Belgian cyclist
- 1979 – Kristjan Rahnu, Estonian decathlete
- 1979 – Ryan Shealy, American baseball player
- 1980 – Chris Simms, American football player
- 1980 – David West, American basketball player
- 1981 – Martin Erat, Czech ice hockey player
- 1981 – Geneviève Jeanson, Canadian cyclist
- 1982 – Ruhila Adatia-Sood, Kenyan journalist and radio host (died 2013)
- 1982 – Carlos Delfino, Argentine–Italian basketball player
- 1982 – Yakhouba Diawara, French basketball player
- 1982 – Vincent Enyeama, Nigerian footballer
- 1983 – Jennifer Landon, American actress
- 1983 – Antti Niemi, Finnish ice hockey player
- 1983 – Anthony Recker, American baseball player
- 1986 – Hajime Isayama, Japanese illustrator
- 1986 – Lea Michele, American actress and singer
- 1987 – Tony Kane, Northern Irish footballer
- 1989 – Charlotte Ritchie, English actress
- 1990 – Jakub Kosecki, Polish footballer
- 1990 – Chris Taylor, American baseball player
- 1990 – Patrick van Aanholt, Dutch footballer
- 1991 – Néstor Araujo, Mexican footballer
- 1991 – Deshaun Thomas, American basketball player
- 1992 – Noah Syndergaard, American baseball player
- 1993 – Lucas Cruikshank, American YouTuber and actor
- 1993 – Liam Payne, English singer-songwriter from One Direction (died 2024)
- 1994 – Ysaline Bonaventure, Belgian tennis player
- 1996 – Daryll Neita, British sprinter
- 2008 – Rio Ngumoha, English footballer

== Deaths ==
=== Pre-1600 ===
- 886 – Basil I, Byzantine emperor (born 811)
- 892 – Theodora of Thessaloniki, Byzantine nun and saint (born 812)
- 939 – Wang Jipeng, Chinese emperor of Min
- 939 – Li Chunyan, Chinese empress
- 956 – Fu the Elder, Chinese empress
- 979 – Abu Taghlib, Hamdanid emir
- 1021 – Minamoto no Yorimitsu, Japanese nobleman (born 948)
- 1046 – Gerard of Csanád Venetian monk and Hungarian bishop (born980)
- 1093 – Hugh I, duke of Burgundy (born 1057)
- 1123 – Eystein I, king of Norway (born 1088)
- 1135 – Al-Mustarshid, Abbasid caliph (born 1092)
- 1159 – Bertha of Sulzbach, Byzantine empress
- 1298 – Eleanor of England, Countess of Bar, English princess (born 1269)
- 1315 – Peter Tempesta, Italian nobleman (born 1291)
- 1315 – Charles of Taranto, Italian nobleman (born 1296)
- 1395 – Albert III, duke of Austria (born 1349)
- 1442 – John V, duke of Brittany (born 1389)
- 1499 – Alesso Baldovinetti, Florentine painter (born 1427)
- 1523 – Ulrich von Hutten, Lutheran reformer (born 1488)
- 1526 – Louis II, king of Hungary and Croatia (born 1506)
- 1526 – Pál Tomori Hungarian archbishop and soldier (born 1475)
- 1533 – Atahualpa, Inca emperor (born 1497)
- 1542 – Cristóvão da Gama, Portuguese commander (born 1516)

=== 1601–1900 ===
- 1604 – Hamida Banu Begum, Mughal empress (born 1527)
- 1657 – John Lilburne, English activist (born 1614)
- 1712 – Gregory King, English genealogist, engraver, and statistician (born 1648)
- 1749 – Matthias Bel, Hungarian pastor and polymath (born 1684)
- 1769 – Edmond Hoyle, English author and educator (born 1672)
- 1780 – Jacques-Germain Soufflot, French architect, co-designed The Panthéon (born 1713)
- 1799 – Pius VI, pope of the Catholic Church (born 1717)
- 1844 – Edmund Ignatius Rice, Irish missionary and educator, founded the Christian Brothers and Presentation Brothers (born 1762)
- 1856 – Mary Anne Schimmelpenninck, English author and activist (born 1778)
- 1866 – Tokugawa Iemochi, Japanese shōgun (born 1846)
- 1877 – Brigham Young, American religious leader, 2nd President of The Church of Jesus Christ of Latter-day Saints (born 1801)
- 1889 – Stefan Dunjov, Bulgarian colonel (born 1815)
- 1891 – Pierre Lallement, French businessman, invented the bicycle (born 1843)
- 1892 – William Forbes Skene, Scottish historian and author (born 1809)

=== 1901–present ===
- 1904 – Murad V, Ottoman sultan (born 1840)
- 1911 – Mir Mahboob Ali Khan, 6th Nizam of Hyderabad (born 1866)
- 1917 – George Huntington Hartford, American businessman (born 1833)
- 1930 – William Archibald Spooner, English priest and author (born 1844)
- 1931 – David T. Abercrombie, American businessman, co-founded Abercrombie & Fitch (born 1867)
- 1932 – Raymond Knister, Canadian poet and author (born 1899)
- 1944 – Attik, Greek pianist and composer (born 1885)
- 1946 – Adolphus Busch III, American businessman (born 1891)
- 1946 – John Steuart Curry, American painter and academic (born 1897)
- 1951 – Sydney Chapman, English economist and civil servant (born 1871)
- 1952 – Anton Piëch, Austrian lawyer (born 1894)
- 1958 – Marjorie Flack, American author and illustrator (born 1897)
- 1966 – Sayyid Qutb, Egyptian theorist, author, and poet (born 1906)
- 1968 – Ulysses S. Grant III, American general (born 1881)
- 1971 – Nathan Freudenthal Leopold Jr., American murderer (born 1904)
- 1972 – Lale Andersen, German singer-songwriter (born 1905)
- 1975 – Éamon de Valera, Irish soldier and politician, 3rd President of Ireland (born 1882)
- 1977 – Jean Hagen, American actress (born 1923)
- 1977 – Brian McGuire, Australian race car driver (born 1945)
- 1979 – Gertrude Chandler Warner, American author and educator (born 1890)
- 1981 – Lowell Thomas, American journalist and author (born 1892)
- 1982 – Ingrid Bergman, Swedish actress (born 1915)
- 1982 – Lehman Engel, American composer and conductor (born 1910)
- 1985 – Evelyn Ankers, British-American actress (born 1918)
- 1987 – Archie Campbell, American actor and screenwriter (born 1914)
- 1987 – Lee Marvin, American actor (born 1924)
- 1989 – Peter Scott, English explorer and painter (born 1909)
- 1990 – Manly Palmer Hall, Canadian-American mystic and author (born 1901)
- 1991 – Libero Grassi, Italian businessman (born 1924)
- 1992 – Félix Guattari, French philosopher and theorist (born 1930)
- 1995 – Frank Perry, American director, producer, and screenwriter (born 1930)
- 2000 – Shelagh Fraser, English actress (born 1922)
- 2000 – Willie Maddren, English footballer and manager (born 1951)
- 2000 – Conrad Marca-Relli, American-Italian painter and academic (born 1913)
- 2001 – Graeme Strachan, Australian singer-songwriter & television personality (born 1952)
- 2001 – Francisco Rabal, Spanish actor, director, and screenwriter (born 1926)
- 2002 – Lance Macklin, English race car driver (born 1919)
- 2003 – Mohammad Baqir al-Hakim, Iraqi politician (born 1939)
- 2003 – Patrick Procktor, English painter and academic (born 1936)
- 2004 – Hans Vonk, Dutch conductor (born 1942)
- 2007 – James Muir Cameron Fletcher, New Zealand businessman (born 1914)
- 2007 – Richard Jewell, American police officer (born 1962)
- 2007 – Pierre Messmer, French civil servant and politician, 154th Prime Minister of France (born 1916)
- 2007 – Alfred Peet, Dutch-American businessman, founded Peet's Coffee & Tea (born 1920)
- 2008 – Geoffrey Perkins, English actor, producer, and screenwriter (born 1953)
- 2008 – Michael Schoenberg, American geophysicist and theorist (born 1939)
- 2011 – Honeyboy Edwards, American singer-songwriter and guitarist (born 1915)
- 2011 – Junpei Takiguchi, Japanese voice actor (born 1931)
- 2012 – Ruth Goldbloom, Canadian academic and philanthropist, co-founded Pier 21 (born 1923)
- 2012 – Nicholas Goodrick-Clarke, English historian and author (born 1953)
- 2012 – Shoshichi Kobayashi, Japanese-American mathematician and academic (born 1932)
- 2012 – Anne McKnight, American soprano (born 1924)
- 2012 – Les Moss, American baseball player, coach, and manager (born 1925)
- 2012 – Sergei Ovchinnikov, Russian volleyball player and coach (born 1969)
- 2013 – Joan L. Krajewski, American lawyer and politician (born 1934)
- 2013 – Medardo Joseph Mazombwe, Zambian cardinal (born 1931)
- 2013 – Bruce C. Murray, American geologist and academic, co-founded The Planetary Society (born 1931)
- 2014 – Octavio Brunetti, Argentine pianist and composer (born 1975)
- 2014 – Björn Waldegård, Swedish race car driver (born 1943)
- 2016 – Gene Wilder, American stage and screen comic actor, screenwriter, film director, and author (born 1933)
- 2018 – James Mirrlees, Scottish economist, Nobel Prize laureate (born 1936)
- 2018 – Paul Taylor, American choreographer (born 1930)
- 2021 – Ed Asner, American actor (born 1929)
- 2021 – Lee "Scratch" Perry, Jamaican reggae producer (born 1936)
- 2021 – Jacques Rogge, Belgian orthopedic surgeon, Olympic sailor and the 8th President of the International Olympic Committee (born 1942)
- 2023 – Mike Enriquez, Filipino broadcaster (born 1951)
- 2024 – Johnny Gaudreau, American ice hockey player (born 1993)

== Holidays and observances ==
- Christian feast day:
  - Adelphus of Metz
  - Beheading of St. John the Baptist
  - Bronislava of Poland
  - Eadwold of Cerne
  - Blessed Edmund Ignatius Rice
  - Euphrasia Eluvathingal (Syro-Malabar Catholic Church)
  - Jeanne Jugan
  - John Bunyan (Episcopal Church)
  - Sabina
  - Blessed Teresa Bracco
  - Vitalis, Sator and Repositus
  - August 29 (Eastern Orthodox liturgics)
- International Day against Nuclear Tests
- Day of Remembrance of the Defenders of Ukraine (Ukraine)
- National Sports Day (India)
- Slovak National Uprising Anniversary (Slovakia)
