= Muhammad ibn Ahmad ibn Ajlan =

Emir of Mecca

Jamāl al-Dīn Muḥammad ibn Aḥmad ibn ‘Ajlān al-Ḥasanī (Arabic: جمال الدين محمد بن أحمد بن عجلان الحسني) was Emir of Mecca in partnership with his father Ahmad ibn Ajlan from 1378/1379 to 1386, then independently for a few months in 1386.

In 780 AH (1378/1379) Ahmad ibn Ajlan made his son Muhammad coregent. The appointment was to little effect, as Ahmad still retained full control over affairs of the Emirate. In 787 AH (1385) Ahmad imprisoned his brother Muhammad ibn Ajlan and his relatives Inan ibn Mughamis, Hasan ibn Thaqabah, Ahmad ibn Thaqabah, and Ali ibn Ahmad ibn Thaqabah. Inan escaped to Egypt and complained to Sultan al-Zahir Barquq. The Sultan ordered Ahmad to release the sharifs, but he refused.

After Ahmad ibn Ajlan's death in Sha'ban 788 AH (September 1386) Muhammad ibn Ahmad became sole Emir of Mecca, with his uncle Kubaysh assuming a powerful role. Muhammad sent word to al-Zahir informing him of his father's death and requesting confirmation of his Emirate. He received the requested decree and khil'ah (robe of honor) either in late Shawwal or mid-Dhu al-Qi'dah 788 AH (November/December 1386).

Around ten days after Ahmad's death, Kubaysh ordered the imprisoned sharifs to be blinded. When al-Zahir received news of this act he became angry with Muhammad and Kubaysh and decided to give the Emirate to Inan ibn Mughamis. He sent Inan to Mecca along with the Hajj caravan, which was led by the Emir Aqbugha al-Mardini. On Monday, 1 Dhu al-Hijjah 788 AH (24 December 1386), when Muhammad ibn Ahmad came out to receive the mahmal he was killed by two Ismaili Assassins, and al-Mardini designated Inan as Emir of Mecca. Muhammad ibn Ahmad was buried in al-Ma'lah cemetery near the grave of his grandfather Ajlan.

== Notes ==
Muḥammad ibn Aḥmad ibn ‘Ajlān Banu Qatadah
Regnal titles
| Preceded by Ahmad ibn Ajlan | Emir of Mecca; 1378/79 – 24 Dec 1386 with Ajlan ibn Rumaythah (1378/79 – Sep 1386) | Succeeded by Inan ibn Mughamis |
