= 1353 =

1353 in various calendars
- Gregorian calendar: 1353; MCCCLIII
- Ab urbe condita: 2106
- Armenian calendar: 802; ԹՎ ՊԲ
- Assyrian calendar: 6103
- Balinese saka calendar: 1274–1275
- Bengali calendar: 759–760
- Berber calendar: 2303
- English Regnal year: 26 Edw. 3 – 27 Edw. 3
- Buddhist calendar: 1897
- Burmese calendar: 715
- Byzantine calendar: 6861–6862
- Chinese calendar: 壬辰年 (Water Dragon); 4050 or 3843 — to — 癸巳年 (Water Snake); 4051 or 3844
- Coptic calendar: 1069–1070
- Discordian calendar: 2519
- Ethiopian calendar: 1345–1346
- Hebrew calendar: 5113–5114
- Hindu calendars
- Vikram Samvat: 1409–1410
- Shaka Samvat: 1274–1275
- Kali Yuga: 4453–4454
- Holocene calendar: 11353
- Igbo calendar: 353–354
- Iranian calendar: 731–732
- Islamic calendar: 753–754
- Japanese calendar: Bunna 2 (文和２年)
- Javanese calendar: 1265–1266
- Julian calendar: 1353; MCCCLIII
- Korean calendar: 3686
- Minguo calendar: 559 before ROC 民前559年
- Nanakshahi calendar: −115
- Thai solar calendar: 1895–1896
- Tibetan calendar: ཆུ་ཕོ་འབྲུག་ལོ་ (male Water-Dragon); 1479 or 1098 or 326 — to — ཆུ་མོ་སྦྲུལ་ལོ་ (female Water-Snake); 1480 or 1099 or 327

August 27: The Navy of the Republic of Genoa has its ships captured or sunk by the combined fleets of the Republic of Venice and the Kingdom of Aragon in the Battle of Alghero.

Year 1353 (MCCCLIII) was a common year starting on Tuesday of the Julian calendar.

== Events ==
=== January–March ===
- January 5 – At Viangchan, Chao Fa Ngum founds the Kingdom of Lan Xang (now Laos), beginning a dynasty that rules for more than 350 years until the kingdom breaks up in 1707. The city survives as Vientiane, capital of the Lao People's Democratic Republic.
- January 20 – (13 Dhu al-Hijjah 753 AH) Malik Ibrahim Bayu, Afghan general and Governor of Bihar in the Sultanate of Delhi during the reign of the Sultan Firoz Shah Tughlaq, is assassinated outside the Rohtasgarh fort.
- January – (Dhu al-Hijjah 754 AH), Thaqabah ibn Rumaythah, Emir of Mecca is removed from office by the Mamluk Egyptian Emir Umar Shah, who arrests Thaqabah and restores Thaqabah's brother Ajlan ibn Rumaythah to the throne.
- February 15 – The town of Alghero, located on the island of Sardinia, submits to the rule of the Republic of Genoa in order to be protected from the Kingdom of Aragon.
- March 1 – King Edward III of England signs the Treaty of Westminster to end the War of the Breton Succession. England agrees to recognize Charles of Blois as Duke of Brittany in return for the payment of 300,000 crowns and an alliance with England against France.
- March 3 – The Canton of Bern signs an alliance with the Old Swiss Confederacy.

=== April–June ===
- April 27 – Ivan the Fair of the Rurik dynasty, becomes the new ruler of the Principality of Moscow and the Grand Principality of Vladimir controlling much of Russia, upon the death of his older brother, the Grand Duke Simeon the Proud, who has died of the Black Death plague.
- May 21 – At the age of 14, Anna von Schweidnitz marries Karl of Luxembourg, King of Bohemia, King of the Romans and King of Germany, three months after the February 21 death of his first wife, the Queen Consort Anne of Bavaria. Anna becomes Queen Consort of Bohemia and of Germany, and later becomes the Holy Roman Empress when Karl is elected as the new Emperor.
- June 20 – Elisabeta Kotromanić, daughter of the ruler of Bosnia, Stjepan II of Bosnia, marries King Lajos of Hungary and Croatia in a ceremony at the Hungarian capital, Buda and becomes the Queen consort.

=== July–September ===
- July 28 – Anna von Schweidnitz is crowned as the Queen of Bohemia by Archbishop Arnošt of Pardubice in a ceremony at Prague.
- August 27 – War of the Straits and Sardinian–Aragonese war – At the Battle of Alghero, the allied Aragonese and Venetian fleets crush the Genoese fleet, most of which is captured.
- September 22 – Zayn al-Din Qaraja, the former Bey of Dulkadir at what is now southeastern Turkey, is deported by order of Ghiyath al-Din Muhammad, Sultan of the Eretnid dynasty of Anatolia and sent to the Mamluk Sultanate of Egypt and Syria. Qaraja had come to the Eretnid capital of Kayseri to seek asylum after failing in an abortive uprising against Egypt. In return for 500,000 dinars, Ghiyath Muhammad sends Qaraja, in chains, to Cairo. As-Salih Salih, Sultan of Egypt, has Qaraja executed on December 11.

=== October–December ===
- October 9 – The Republic of Genoa, led by the Doge Giovanni II Valente, and unable to pay its wartime expenses, agrees to submit to the rule of the Lord of Milan, Archbishop Giovanni Visconti.
- November 8 – Francesco di Petracco, Italian poet known in English as Petrarch, delivers a speech before the Great Council of the Republic of Venice, to prevent a war between Venice and the Republic of Genoa and the Lordship of Milan. While averting a war, Petrarch's speech ruins a plan for forging an alliance against the Visconti family.
- December 14 – (14 Dhu'l-Qa'da 754 AH) Togha Temür, Mongol conqueror of provinces of Persia, is assassinated by Khwaja Ahia Kiratí, chief of the Sarbadáls.

=== Date unknown ===
- The Moroccan traveler Ibn Battuta makes the first recorded visit to Timbuktu and Kabara, when returning from a stay in the capital of the Mali Empire.
- The Decameron is finished by Giovanni Boccaccio.

== Births ==
- March – Margaret I of Denmark, queen of Haakon VI of Norway (d. 1412)
- July 15 – Vladimir the Bold, Russian prince (d. 1410)
- date unknown
  - Thomas Arundel, Archbishop of Canterbury (d. 1414)
  - Helvis of Brunswick-Grubenhagen, queen consort of Armenia and Cyprus (d. 1421)
  - John Purvey, English scholar and Bible translator (d. 1428)

== Deaths ==
- February 2 – Anne of Bavaria, queen consort of Bohemia (b. 1329)
- March 6 – Roger Grey, 1st Baron Grey de Ruthyn
- March 11 – Theognostus, metropolitan of Kiev and Moscow
- April 27 – Simeon of Russia, Grand Prince of Moscow and Vladimir
- October 4 – Rudolf II, Duke of Bavaria (b. 1306)
- December 14 – Togha Temür, claimant to the throne of the Mongol Il-Khanate in Persia (assassinated)
- date unknown
  - Matilda, daughter of King Robert the Bruce of Scotland
  - Elisabeth of Austria, Duchess of Lorraine, regent of Lorraine
  - Sir Ulick Burke, Irish nobleman
