= Ahmad ibn Ajlan =

Shihāb al-Dīn Abū Sulaymān Aḥmad ibn ‘Ajlān ibn Rumaythah al-Ḥasanī (Arabic: شهاب الدين أبو سليمان أحمد بن عجلان بن رميثة الحسني) was Emir of Mecca from 1361 to 1386.

Ahmad was born around 740 AH (c. 1339), (Note: He was around 48 when died in 788 AH.) the son of Ajlan ibn Rumaythah. He served as deputy to his father during the latter's co-reign with Thaqabah ibn Rumaythah. After Ajlan and Thaqabah were deposed by Sultan al-Nasir Hasan in 1359, Ahmad and his brother Kubaysh were imprisoned in Egypt along with their father. They were released in 762 AH (1361) when Ajlan was reappointed to the Emirate of Mecca. When Ajlan assumed the Emirate in early Shawwal 762 AH (August 1361) he appointed Ahmad as coregent. In 774 AH (1372) Ajlan abdicated his share of the Emirate to Ahmad, though his name continued to be mentioned in the khutbah alongside Ahmad's until he died in 777 AH (1375). In 780 AH (1378/1379) Ahmad appointed his own son Muhammad as co-Emir. Ahmad died on Saturday night, 20 Sha'ban 788 AH (14–15 September 1386). He was buried in al-Ma'lah cemetery and a qubba was built over his grave.

== Notes ==
Aḥmad ibn ‘Ajlān ibn Rumaythah Banu Qatadah
Regnal titles
Preceded by Sanad ibn Rumaythah	Emir of Mecca; Aug 1361 – Sep 1386 with Ajlan ibn Rumaythah (1361–1372); Muhammad ibn Ahmad (1378/79 – 1386)	Succeeded by Muhammad ibn Ahmad
Preceded by Thaqabah ibn Rumaythah	Emir of Mecca; Aug 1361 – Sep 1386 with Ajlan ibn Rumaythah (1361–1372); Muhammad ibn Ahmad (1378/79 – 1386)	Succeeded by Muhammad ibn Ahmad
