= Montecatini =

Montecatini may refer to

== Places in Italy ==
- Montecatini Terme, a municipality in the province of Pistoia in Tuscany
  - RB Montecatini Terme, basketball team in the district above
  - Battle of Montecatini, 1315 battle near the district above
- Montecatini Val di Cecina, comune in the province of Pisa in Tuscany
- Montecatini, hamlet in the comune of San Martino in Rio

== Business ==
- Montecatini (company), Italian chemicals combine
