= Thaqabah ibn Rumaythah =

Asad al-Dīn Abū Shihāb Thaqabah ibn Rumaythah ibn Muḥammad Abī Numayy al-Ḥasanī (Arabic: أسد الدين أبو شهاب ثقبة بن رميثة بن محمد أبي نمي الحسني) was Emir of Mecca six times between 1344 and 1361.

== Biography ==
Thaqabah was the son of Rumaythah ibn Abi Numayy, Emir of Mecca.

In 744 AH (1343/1344) Thaqabah and his brother Ajlan purchased the Emirate of Mecca from their father for 60,000 dirhams. Soon afterwards, Thaqabah went to Egypt in response to summons from Sultan al-Salih Isma'il while Ajlan remained in Mecca. In Dhu al-Qi'dah 744 AH (March/April 1344) news reached Mecca that al-Salih had arrested Thaqabah and returned the Emirate to Rumaythah.

Thaqabah was later released and returned to Mecca. In 746 AH (1345) Ajlan became Emir of Mecca and expelled Thaqabah to Wadi Nakhlah. Later that year Thaqabah was arrested in Egypt with his brothers Sanad and Mughamis.

In 747 AH (1346/1347) or 748 AH (1347/1348) Sultan al-Kamil Sha'ban released Thaqabah, Sanad, and Mughamis and appointed them co-rulers with Ajlan. In 750 AH Thaqabah ousted Ajlan from the Emirate. On 5 Shawwal 750 AH (c. 16 December 1349) Ajlan retook the Emirate from his brothers and Thaqabah traveled to Yemen.

In 752 AH (1351) Thaqabah established himself at al-Jadid in opposition to his brother in Mecca. That year the Sultan summoned them both to Egypt; they traveled separately but Ajlan turned back at Yanbu. Thaqabah reached Cairo and was appointed Emir of Mecca in place of his brother. He returned to Mecca in Dhu al-Qi'dah 752 AH (December 1351 / January 1352) with 50 mamluks but Ajlan prevented him from entering the city. Thaqabah waited at Khulays until the Hajj arrived. After mediation by the Egyptian amir al-rakab, Ajlan agreed to share the Emirate with Thaqabah.

In 753 AH (1352) Thaqabah deposed Ajlan. He reigned until Dhu al-Hijjah 754 AH (January 1353) when the Egyptian amir al-rakab Umar Shah arrested him and installed Ajlan to the Emirate. Thaqabah was imprisoned in Egypt until 756 AH (1355), when the amir al-'arab Fayyad ibn Muhanna interceded for him.

In Muharram 757 AH (January 1356) Ajlan and Thaqabah reconciled and divided the Emirate between them. On 13 Jumada al-Akhir (c. 13 June) Thaqabah deposed Ajlan, but when the Hajj arrived (November 1356) Ajlan reentered Mecca and Thaqabah fled to Yemen.

In Dhu al-Hijjah 758 AH (November 1357) the brothers again reconciled and agreed to rule in partnership. In Jumada al-Awwal 760 AH (April 1359) Sultan al-Nasir Hasan summoned them both to appear before him but they did not do so. The following month they received word that al-Nasir had deposed them and appointed in their place their brother Sanad and their cousin Muhammad ibn Utayfah. Ajlan proposed to Thaqabah that they each give 400 camels to secure the allegiance of the Banu Hasan and preserve their rule. Thaqabah rejected Ajlan's proposal, and Ibn Utayfah assumed the Emirate when he arrived with Egyptian forces in late Jumada al-Akhir (May 1359).

After the Hajj of 761 AH (October/November 1359) Ibn Utayfah departed with the Egyptian army, and Thaqabah took his place as co-ruler with Sanad. In 762 AH Ajlan was released from prison and appointed Emir of Mecca alongside Thaqabah. He arrived in Ramadan and met Thaqabah at Wadi Marr, but Thaqabah was ill and died there, either in Ramadan or early Shawwal (July/August 1361). He was buried in the Ma'lah cemetery, near his father Rumaythah.

== Issue ==
Thaqabah had four sons: Ahmad, Hasan, Ali, and Mubarak. He also had a daughter, Fatimah.

== Notes ==
Thaqabah ibn Rumaythah ibn Muḥammad Abī Numayy Banu Qatadah
Regnal titles
Preceded by Rumaythah	Emir of Mecca; 1343/44 – Mar/Apr 1344 with Ajlan	Succeeded by Rumaythah
Preceded by Ajlan	Emir of Mecca c. 1347 – Dec 1349 with Ajlan (deposed 1349); Sanad; Mughamis	Succeeded by Ajlan
Preceded by Ajlan	Emir of Mecca; Jan 1352 – Jan 1353 with Ajlan (deposed 1352)	Succeeded by Ajlan
Preceded by Ajlan	Emir of Mecca; Jan 1356 – Nov 1356 with Ajlan (deposed Jun 1356)	Succeeded by Ajlan
Preceded by Ajlan	Emir of Mecca; Nov 1357 – May 1359 with Ajlan	Succeeded by Sanad
Preceded by Ajlan	Emir of Mecca; Nov 1357 – May 1359 with Ajlan	Succeeded by Muhammad ibn Utayfah
Preceded by Muhammad ibn Utayfah	Emir of Mecca; Oct/Nov 1359 – Jul/Aug 1361 with Sanad	Succeeded by Ajlan
Preceded by Muhammad ibn Utayfah	Emir of Mecca; Oct/Nov 1359 – Jul/Aug 1361 with Sanad	Succeeded by Ahmad ibn Ajlan
