= Al-Ajlani =

al-Ajlani (Arabic: العجلاني) is an Arabic surname. Notable people with the surname include:

- Ahmad Al-Ajlani (born 1960), Tunisian footballer and manager
- Munir al-Ajlani (died 2004), Syrian politician, lawyer, writer and scholar

== See also ==
- Ajlan
