= Humaydah ibn Abi Numayy =

14th-century Emir of Mecca

Emir of Mecca
- 1st reign: Oct 1301 – Aug 1302
- Predecessor: Abu Numayy I
- Successor: Abu al-Ghayth; Utayfah
- Coregent: Rumaythah
- 2nd reign: Jul 1305 – 1314
- Predecessor: Abu al-Ghayth; Utayfah
- Successor: Abu al-Ghayth
- Coregent: Rumaythah
- 3rd reign: 1314 – Dec 1315
- Predecessor: Abu al-Ghayth
- Successor: Rumaythah
- 4th reign: c. Mar 1318 – c. Jun 1318
- Predecessor: Rumaythah
- Successor: Rumaythah
- House: Banu Hasan; Banu Qatadah
- Father: Abu Numayy I

‘Izz al-Dīn Ḥumayḍah ibn Muḥammad Abī Numayy al-Ḥasanī (Arabic: عز الدين حميضة بن محمد أبي نمي الحسني) was Emir of Mecca four times. He was killed in Jumada al-Thani 720 AH (July/August 1320).

== First reign, in partnership with Rumaythah ==
Humaydah was one of 30 sons of Abu Numayy I, who ruled Mecca between 1254 and 1301. He and his brother Rumaythah were proclaimed as joint emirs in Safar 701 AH (October 1301), two days before Abu Numayy's death. They were initially opposed by a faction of the ashraf who supported their brothers Abu al-Ghayth and Utayfah. Humaydah emerged predominant and imprisoned Abu al-Ghayth and Utayfah. However, they managed to escape and when the hajj season arrived they gained the favor of the Egyptian emirs, chief among them Baybars al-Jashnakir. Consequently, in Dhu al-Hijjah 701 AH (August 1302), after the completion of the hajj rites, Baybars arrested Humaydah and Rumaythah, and installed their brothers to the throne. Baybars returned to Cairo in Muharram 702 AH, with Humaydah and Rumaythah in chains.

In 703 AH the brothers were released from prison. The sultan al-Nasir Muhammad dressed them in traditional Mamluk costume with kalafatah caps of zarkash (brocade). Humaydah initially refused to wear the dress before he was threatened with imprisonment. Thereafter the brothers were granted stipends and joined the ranks of the sultan's emirs. They rode with the sultan on the maydan (parade grounds), and Humaydah played polo with the sultan.

== Second reign, in partnership with Rumaythah ==
In 704 AH the shaykh Nasr al-Manbiji interceded for Humaydah and Rumaythah to forego Mamluk attire in favor of their own Hejazi dress. Later that year the sultan reappointed them to the emirate of Mecca, as he had become displeased with their brothers. They accompanied the annual hajj caravan from Cairo, and in Dhu al-Hijjah 704 AH (July 1305), after the completion of the hajj rites, Baybars al-Jashnakir arrested Abu al-Ghayth and Utayfah and installed Humaydah and Rumaythah to the throne.

Humaydah and Rumaythah initially acted justly and instituted popular policies including repeals of some of the mukus taxes. However in the following years they became guilty of various misdeeds and abuses. As a result, during the hajj of 710 AH (1311) they left Mecca to avoid an Egyptian force that was sent against them. In 712 AH (1313) they again abandoned Mecca when al-Nasir himself performed the pilgrimage with a large army. Finally, in Shawwal 713 AH (January/February 1314) al-Nasir dispatched an army to install Abu al-Ghayth to the throne, with 320 Mamluk cavalry and 500 horsemen from the Banu Husayn of Medina. The Egyptian emirs were Sayf al-Din Taqsuba al-Nasiri, Wali of Qus and commander of the army, Sayf al-Din Baktamur, Sarim al-Din Saruja al-Husami, and Ala al-Din Aydughdi al-Khwarizmi. They were joined from Damascus by the emir Sayf al-Din Balaban al-Tatari. When Humaydah and Rumaythah heard of the army's approach they fled towards Haly Bani Ya'qub. After the hajj the army remained in Mecca for about two months to support Abu al-Ghayth.

== Third reign ==
After the Egyptian army departed Mecca, Humaydah gathered his forces and captured the city, inflicting a loss on Abu al-Ghayth of around 15 foot soldiers and over 20 horsemen. Humaydah sent a tribute to al-Nasir in an attempt to regain his favor, but it was not accepted and his messenger was imprisoned. The sultan sent reinforcements to Abu al-Ghayth and ordered the Emir of Medina to assist him. On Tuesday, 4 Dhu al-Hijjah 714 AH (11 March 1315), Humaydah faced and defeated Abu al-Ghayth's larger force near Mecca. Abu al-Ghayth was injured in the battle and captured, then executed on Humaydah's orders at Khayf Bani Shadid.

In Sha'ban 715 AH (November 1315) al-Nasir dispatched Rumaythah to Mecca with an army led by the emirs Majd al-Din Damurkhan ibn Qaraman and Sayf al-Din Taydamur al-Jamadar. Six days before the army's arrival, Humaydah loaded up a hundred camels with money and goods, burned what was left in the castle at Wadi Marr, and destroyed two thousand date palms. Then he made making his way to al-Khalf wal-Khulayf, a castle six days journey from Mecca, and sought refuge with its master. The Egyptian army reached Mecca with Rumaythah on 15 Ramadan (13 December). After two weeks they proceeded to al-Khalf wal-Khulayf, where they looted the castle and seized Humaydah's wealth. His son of twelve was captured and turned over to Rumaythah, while Humaydah himself escaped to Iraq.

== Fourth reign ==
After the departure of the hajj, either in Dhu al-Hijjah 717 AH or Muharram 718 AH (February or March 1318), Humaydah overthrew Rumaythah with the assent of his slaves. He replaced the name of al-Nasir in the khutbah with that of Abu Sa'id Bahadur Khan, son of Uljaytu. The Ilkhanid khutbah was short-lived, however, for in late Rabi I (May 1318) al-Nasir sent an army which restored Rumaythah to the throne.

== Notes ==
Humaydah ibn Abi Numayy Banu Qatadah
Regnal titles
Preceded by Abu Numayy I	Emir of Mecca; Oct 1301 – Aug 1302 with Rumaythah	Succeeded by Abu al-Ghayth
Preceded by Abu Numayy I	Emir of Mecca; Oct 1301 – Aug 1302 with Rumaythah	Succeeded by Utayfah
Preceded by Abu al-Ghayth	Emir of Mecca; Jul 1305 – 1314 with Rumaythah	Succeeded by Abu al-Ghayth
Preceded by Utayfah	Emir of Mecca; Jul 1305 – 1314 with Rumaythah	Succeeded by Abu al-Ghayth
Preceded by Abu al-Ghayth	Emir of Mecca; 1314 – Dec 1315	Succeeded by Rumaythah
Preceded by Rumaythah	Emir of Mecca c. Mar 1318 – c. Jun 1318	Succeeded by Rumaythah
