= Ali ibn Mubarak =

Alī ibn Mubārak ibn Rumaythah ibn ibn Muḥammad Abī Numayy al-Ḥasanī (Arabic: علي بن مبارك بن رميثة بن محمد أبي نمي الحسني) was a co-Emir of Mecca during the reign of his cousin Inan ibn Mughamis.
