= Rümeysa =

Rümeysa, or Rumeysa, is a feminine given name, the Turkish form of Arabic Rumaythah (رُمَيْثَة) – the name of two companions of Muhammad – or Rumaysah (رُمَيْسَة), with several meanings. Notable people with the name include:

- Rumeysa Aredba (c. 1873–1927), Abkhazian princess;
- Rumeysa Gelgi (born 1997), Turkish advocate and web developer, the world's tallest woman;
- Rümeysa Kadak (born 1996), Turkish politician;
- Rümeysa Öztürk (born 1994/95), Turkish student kidnapped by US authorities in 2025;
- Rümeysa Pelin Kaya (born 2000), Turkish sport shooter.

== See also ==
- Romaisa
- Rumaysa bint Milhan
