= Ahmad ibn Thaqabah =

Aḥmad ibn Thaqabah ibn Rumaythah ibn ibn Muḥammad Abī Numayy al-Ḥasanī (Arabic: أحمد بن ثقبة بن رميثة بن محمد أبي نمي الحسني; d. June 1409 (late Muharram 812 AH)) was a co-Emir of Mecca during the reign of his cousin Inan ibn Mughamis.
