= Aqil ibn Mubarak =

‘Aqīl ibn Mubārak ibn Rumaythah ibn ibn Muḥammad Abī Numayy al-Ḥasanī (Arabic: عقيل بن مبارك بن رميثة بن محمد أبي نمي الحسني; d. 1422) was a co-Emir of Mecca during the reign of his cousin Inan ibn Mughamis. He died in 825 AH (1422).
