= Charles of Taranto =

Eldest son of Philip I, Prince of Taranto

Charles of Taranto (1296 – 29 August 1315) was the eldest son of Philip I, Prince of Taranto and titular Latin Emperor of Constantinople, and his wife, Thamar Angelina Komnene, daughter of the Despot of Epirus, Nikephoros I Komnenos Doukas.

== Biography ==
Charles' father, Philip, was invested with the Principality of Achaea in southern Greece in 1307. However, there existed a rival claim to the principality in the person of Matilda of Hainaut, the wife of Guy II de la Roche, Duke of Athens. Guy was made Philip's bailli in Achaea, but he died in 1308 without children, leaving Matilda a widow. In 1309, the fifteen-year-old Matilda was betrothed to the twelve-year-old Charles, in an attempt to reconcile the competing claims to Achaea. The ceremony took place at Thebes on 2 April, in the presence of the Latin Archbishop of Athens, the Angevin bailli and the assembled nobility of Achaea and the Duchy of Athens.

The betrothal between Charles and Matilda was dissolved in 1313, and Matilda married Louis of Burgundy, as part of a complex marital pact wherein Matilda was ceded Achaea (although Philip retained suzerain rights over the principality, which he had held since 1294). As part of a series of marriages and pacts that year, Philip made a second marriage to Catherine of Valois, titular Latin Empress (who had been betrothed to Louis' brother, Hugh V of Burgundy), while Charles was betrothed to his new stepmother's sister, Joan of Valois in compensation for the breaking off of his previous engagement.

Like the first, this betrothal was never to be consummated. In 1315, Philip went north in command of Neapolitan troops to relieve the Florentine Guelphs, besieged at Montecatini by the Pisan Ghibellines under Uguccione della Faggiuola. Charles of Taranto and Philip's younger brother, Peter, Count of Gravina accompanied him. Despite initial successes, Philip fell ill with fever, and was crushingly defeated by Uguccione at the Battle of Montecatini. Charles was killed on the field, and his uncle lost; the ailing Philip escaped.

Charles's body was found near that of Uguccione's son, Francesco; their contemporaries assumed they had slain one another. Rainieri della Gherardesca had sworn not to be knighted until he had been revenged on the Angevins for the death of his father, who had been executed by Charles I of Naples with Conradin in 1268. He now accepted the accolade with a foot upon the corpse of Charles of Taranto. Bartholomew of Lucca helped arrange the retrieval of Charles' body from the Pisans after the battle. Remigio dei Girolami, a Dominican supporter of Charles' uncle, Robert, King of Naples, preached a sermon on Charles' death.

== Sources ==
- Bury, John Bagnell, ed. (1932). The Cambridge Medieval History, Volume VII: Decline of the Empire and Papacy. Cambridge University Press.
- Kelly, Samantha (2003). The New Solomon: Robert of Naples (1309–1343) and Fourteenth-Century Kingship. Leiden: Koninklijke Brill NV. ISBN 90-04-12945-6.
- Longnon, Jean (1949). L'empire latin de Constantinople et la principauté de Morée (in French). Paris: Payot.
- Lognon, Jean (1969). "The Frankish States in Greece, 1204–1311". In Setton, Kenneth M.; Wolff, Robert Lee; Hazard, Harry W. (eds.). A History of the Crusades, Vol. II: The later Crusades, 1189–1311. Madison, Wisconsin: University of Wisconsin Press. pp. 235–276.
- Nicol, Donald M. (1984). The Despotate of Epiros 1267-1479: A Contribution to the History of Greece in the Middle Ages. Cambridge University Press. ISBN 9780521261906.
- Topping, Peter (1975). "The Morea, 1311–1364". In Hazard, Harry W. (ed.). A History of the Crusades, Vol. III: The fourteenth and fifteenth centuries. University of Wisconsin Press. pp. 104–140. ISBN 0-299-06670-3. Archived from the original on 1 October 2013.
- Valentiner, William Reinhold; Walther, Josephine L.; Boothroyd, R. H. (1935). Tino di Camaino: a Sienese sculptor of the fourteenth century. Paris: Pegasus Press.
