= Abu al-Ghayth ibn Abi Numayy =

14th-century Emir of Mecca

Emir of Mecca
- 1st reign: Aug 1302 – Jul 1305
- Predecessor: Humaydah; Rumaythah
- Successor: Humaydah; Rumaythah
- Coregent: Utayfah
- 2nd reign: 1314
- Predecessor: Humaydah; Rumaythah
- Successor: Humaydah
- Died: Mar 1315; Khayf Bani Shadid (in present-day Mecca Province, Saudi Arabia)
- House: Banu Hasan; Banu Qatadah
- Father: Abu Numayy I

‘Imād al-Dīn Abū al-Ghayth ibn Abī Numayy al-Ḥasanī (Arabic: عماد الدين أبو الغيث بن أبي نمي الحسني) was Emir of Mecca from 1302 to 1305, and again in 1314. He was killed by his brother Humaydah. He was one of 30 sons of Abu Numayy I, who had ruled Mecca between 1254 and 1301. His mother belonged to the Hudhayl tribe.

== First reign ==
After Abu Numayy's death in Safar 701 AH (October 1301) a succession dispute ensued. A faction of the ashraf supported Abu al-Ghayth and his brother Utayfah against their brothers Humaydah and Rumaythah, who had already been proclaimed as joint emirs two days before their father's death. Abu al-Ghayth and Utayfah were captured and imprisoned for some time, but they managed to escape. When the Egyptian hajj caravan arrived (led by Baybars al-Mansuri al-Dawadar), Abu al-Ghayth and Utayfah met with a number of high-ranking emirs, chief among them Baybars al-Jashnakir, and complained to them about their brothers. After the completion of the hajj rites (August 1302), Baybars arrested Humaydah and Rumaythah. He installed Abu al-Ghayth and Utayfah to the throne, and had them pledge their fealty to the sultan al-Nasir Muhammad. Abu al-Ghayth and Utayfah's assumption of the emirate is reported by Baybars al-Dawadar in Zubdat al-fikrah. However, Ibn Abd al-Majid writes in Bahjat al-zaman that it was Muhammad ibn Idris, not Utayfah, who was installed alongside Abu al-Ghayth. After a few days, Abu al-Ghayth expelled Muhammad ibn Idris. There was fighting between them and many ashraf were killed.

In 702 AH, al-Nasir sent orders to Abu al-Ghayth and Utayfah to put an end to certain perceived heresies that had been reported by Baybars al-Jashnakir, among which were the inclusion of the Shia formula, "Ḥayya ‘alá khayri l-‘amal (Hasten to the best of deeds)," in the adhan (call to prayer), and the posting of a Zaydi imam in the Masjid al-Haram.

When the amir al-rakab returned to Cairo in early 703 AH, he complained to the sultan about the brothers' lack of solemnity and the excessive greed of their slaves.

In Dhu al-Hijjah 704 AH, after the completion of the hajj rites (July 1305), Baybars al-Jashnakir informed Abu al-Ghayth and Utayfah that al-Nasir had returned the emirate to their brothers. When they refused to accept, he arrested them and took them back with the returning caravan. In Egypt Abu al-Ghayth and Utayfah were granted stipends and rode with the sultan's emirs.

== Second reign and death ==
In Shawwal 713 AH (January/February 1314) al-Nasir dispatched an army with the hajj caravan to remove Humaydah and Rumaythah from the emirate, as he had received many complaints against them. Abu al-Ghayth was reappointed as Emir of Mecca and accompanied the army, which included 320 Mamluk cavalry and 500 horsemen from the Banu Husayn of Medina. The emirs included Sayf al-Din Taqsuba al-Nasiri, Wali of Qus and commander of the army, Sayf al-Din Baktamur, Sarim al-Din Saruja al-Husami, Ala al-Din Aydughdi al-Khwarizmi, and Sayf al-Din Balaban al-Tatari, the amir al-rakab from Damascus. When Humaydah and Rumaythah learned of the army's approach, they fled towards Haly Bani Ya'qub.

After the hajj, Taqsuba remained in Mecca with the army for about two months to support Abu al-Ghayth. In Muharram 714 AH (April/May 1314) they took out an expedition to track down Humaydah and Rumaythah, but were unsuccessful. Taqsuba refused to enter Haly Bani Ya'qub without a marsum (written order) from al-Nasir, as it was within the dominion of the Rasulid sultan al-Mu'ayyad Da'ud. Soon after that the army departed, reaching Cairo in Rabi I 714 AH.

When Humaydah learned of the army's departure, he gathered his forces and captured Mecca. Abu al-Ghayth's killed numbered around 15 foot soldiers and over 20 horsemen. He took refuge with his Hudahyl relatives at Wadi Nakhlah and sent to al-Nasir for assistance. The sultan sent Abu al-Ghayth reinforcements, and reportedly ordered the Emir of Medina to assist him. On Tuesday, 4 Dhu al-Hijjah (11 March 1315), Abu al-Ghayth and Humaydah fought near Mecca. Though Abu al-Ghayth's forces were greater in number, he was once again defeated. Wounded in battle, he was captured then executed on Humaydah's orders at Khayf Bani Shadid.

== Notes ==
Abu al-Ghayth ibn Abi Numayy Banu Qatadah
Regnal titles
| Preceded by Humaydah | Emir of Mecca; Aug 1302 – Jul 1305 with Utayfah | Succeeded by Humaydah |
| Preceded by Rumaythah | Emir of Mecca; Aug 1302 – Jul 1305 with Utayfah | Succeeded by Rumaythah |
| Preceded by Humaydah | Emir of Mecca; 1314 | Succeeded by Humaydah |
| Preceded by Rumaythah | Emir of Mecca; 1314 | Succeeded by Humaydah |
