= Ajlan ibn Rumaythah =

14th century Emir of Mecca

Emir of Mecca
- 1st reign: 1343/44 – Mar/Apr 1344
- Predecessor: Rumaythah
- Successor: Rumaythah
- Co-Emir: Thaqabah
- 2nd reign: 1345 – 1349
- Predecessor: Rumaythah
- Successors: Thaqabah; Sanad; Mughamis
- Co-Emirs: Thaqabah; Sanad; Mughamis
- 3rd reign: Dec 1349 – 1352
- Predecessors: Thaqabah; Sanad; Mughamis
- Successor: Thaqabah
- Co-Emir: Thaqabah
- 4th reign: Jan 1353 – Jun 1356
- Predecessor: Thaqabah
- Successor: Thaqabah
- Co-Emir: Thaqabah
- 5th reign: Nov 1356 – May 1359
- Predecessor: Thaqabah
- Successors: Sanad; Muhammad ibn Utayfah
- Co-Emir: Thaqabah
- 6th reign: Aug 1361 – 1372
- Predecessors: Thaqabah; Sanad
- Successor: Ahmad
- Co-Emir: Ahmad
- Born: c. 1307; Hejaz
- Died: 7–8 Oct 1375 al-Jadid, Wadi Marr, Hejaz (present-day Wadi Fatimah, Mecca Province, Saudi Arabia)
- Burial: al-Ma'lah cemetery
Names
- ‘Ajlān ibn Rumaythah ibn Muḥammad Abī Numayy al-Ḥasanī; Arabic: عجلان بن رميثة بن أبي نمي الحسني
Regnal name
- ‘Izz al-Dīn; Arabic: عز الدين
- House: Banu Hasan; Banu Qatadah
- Father: Rumaythah ibn Abi Numayy

‘Izz al-Dīn Abū Sarī‘ ‘Ajlān ibn Rumaythah ibn Muḥammad Abī Numayy al-Ḥasanī (Arabic: عز الدين أبو سريع عجلان بن رميثة بن محمد أبي نمي الحسني) was Emir of Mecca from 1344 and 1372, with interruptions.

== Biography ==
Ajlan was born around 707 AH (c. 1307). (Note: He was reported to be close to 70 when died in 777 AH.) He was the son of the Emir of Mecca Rumaythah ibn Abi Numayy, who reigned between 1301 and 1345.

In 744 AH (1343/1344) Ajlan and his brother Thaqabah purchased the emirate from their elderly father for 60,000 dirhams, without approval from the Mamluk sultan. Consequently, when Thaqabah arrived in Egypt seeking recognition from al-Salih Isma'il, the sultan had him arrested and ordered the emirate returned to Rumaythah. In late Dhu al-Qi'dah (April 1344) Ajlan quit Mecca after receiving news of Thaqabah's capture. He went to Yemen, where he interfered with the passage of jilab (ships) to Mecca, resulting in high inflation during the hajj that year. After the departure of the hajj caravans from the city, Ajlan returned to Mecca and reconciled with his father.

In Muharram 746 AH (May 1345) Ajlan traveled to Egypt and al-Salih appointed him emir of Mecca in place of his father. He returned to Mecca in Jumada II 746 AH accompanied by 50 mamluks and carrying a decree of appointment from the new sultan al-Kamil Sha'ban (al-Salih died before Ajlan took office). He took over the emirate without bloodshed, and on the evening of 18 Jumada II (15 October 1345) the dua was made for Ajlan and for al-Kamil, and discontinued for Rumaythah.

To secure his power Ajlan expelled his brother Thaqabah to Wadi Nakhlah, and his brothers Sanad and Mughamis to Wadi Marr al-Zahran. In early Dhu al-Qi'dah (February/March 1346) he received word from the Sultan's messenger that his brothers had been arrested in Egypt.

In 747 AH (1346/1347) or 748 AH (1347/1348) al-Kamil released Thaqabah, Sanad, and Mughamis and appointed them co-rulers with Ajlan. Ajlan was briefly ousted by Thaqabah in 750 AH, but he returned from Egypt on 5 Shawwal 750 AH (c. 16 December 1349) and retook the Emirate from his brothers.

In Dhu al-Hijjah 752 AH (January 1352) after mediation from the Egyptian amir al-rakab, Ajlan agreed to rule in partnership with Thaqabah. The following year Thaqabah deposed him. In Dhu al-Hijjah 754 AH (January 1353) after Thaqabah refused an offer to share the throne with Ajlan, the Egyptian amir al-rakab Umar Shah arrested him and designated Ajlan sole Emir of Mecca.

In Muharram 757 AH (January 1356) Ajlan again agreed to share the Emirate with Thaqabah. On 13 Jumada al-Akhir (c. 13 June) Thaqabah deposed him, but when the Hajj arrived (November 1356) Ajlan reentered Mecca and Thaqabah fled. In Dhu al-Hijjah 758 AH (November 1357) the brothers reconciled and Thaqabah returned as co-ruler.

In Jumada al-Awwal 760 AH (April 1359) Sultan al-Nasir Hasan summoned Ajlan and Thaqabah to appear before him but they did not do so. The following month they received word that al-Nasir had deposed them and appointed in their place their brother Sanad and their cousin Muhammad ibn Utayfah. Ajlan proposed to Thaqabah that they each give 400 camels to secure the allegiance of the Banu Hasan and preserve their rule. Thaqabah rejected Ajlan's proposal, and Ibn Utayfah assumed the Emirate when he arrived with Egyptian forces in late Jumada al-Akhir (May 1359).

Ajlan went to Egypt, but upon his arrival al-Nasir had him arrested and imprisoned. In 762 AH (1361) al-Nasir was killed and replaced by al-Mansur Muhammad. Emir Yalbugha al-Umari released Ajlan and had him reappointed to the Emirate of Mecca in partnership with Thaqabah, who was then coregent with Sanad. In Ramadan (July 1361) Ajlan reached Wadi Marr where he met Thaqabah. Thaqabah was ill, and Ajlan did not proceed to Mecca until early Shawwal 762 AH (August 1361), after Thaqabah's death. Upon assuming the Emirate he ousted Sanad and appointed his own son Ahmad as coregent.

In 763 AH (1361/1362) Ajlan conquered Haly Ibn Yaqub, a feat not accomplished by any Sharif of Mecca before him since Abu al-Futuh al-Hasan ibn Ja'far (r. 994–1039).

In 774 AH (1372) Ajlan relinquished full control of the Emirate to Ahmad, though his name continued to be mentioned alongside his son's in the khutbah until his death. He died at al-Jadid in Wadi Marr on Monday night, 11 Jumada al-Ula 777 AH (7–8 October 1375) and was buried in al-Ma'lah cemetery, where a qubba was built over his grave.
