= Teresa Bracco =

Italian martyr and Blessed (1924–1944)

Blessed Teresa Bracco
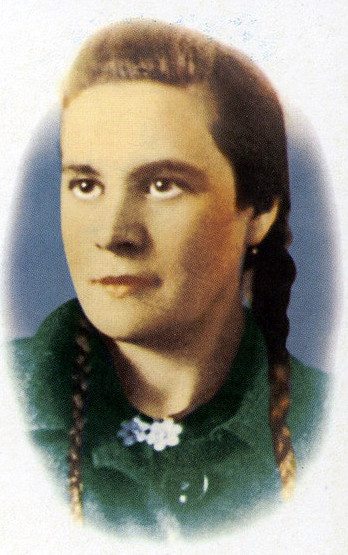

Martyr
- Born: 24 February 1924; Santa Giulia, Dego, Savona, Kingdom of Italy
- Died: 28 August 1944 (aged 20); Santa Giulia, Dego, Savona, Kingdom of Italy
- Venerated in: Roman Catholic Church
- Beatified: 24 May 1998, Turin, Italy by Pope John Paul II
- Feast: 28 August, 30 August (in Aqui Terme)

Teresa Bracco (24 February 1924 – 28 August 1944) was an Italian Catholic from Savona killed during World War II after refusing to submit to the sexual aggression of a Nazi soldier. Bracco was born to modest farmers and tilled in the fields while also attending Masses on a frequent basis.

Bracco was beatified in 1998 on the occasion of Pope John Paul II's visit to Turin. Her beatification was approved after it was proven that she was killed in the defense of remaining a Christian virgin.

== Life ==
Teresa Bracco was born in Dego – in Savona – in 1924 as the sixth of seven children to farmers Giacomo Bracco and Anna Pera. Her two brothers died within a week of each other. Her siblings were:

- Giovanni – died in 1927 from typhus
- Luigi – died in 1927 from typhus
- Giuseppina
- Maria
- Adele
- Anna – born in 1928

The birth of her sister Anna was one of profound happiness for her parents though her father would have preferred a male in order to take possession of the farm when he was older. Bracco received her baptism in 1924 and had been named in honor of Saint Thérèse of Lisieux.

In the evenings her father presided over the recitation of rosaries. Bracco often recited several rosaries as she did her chores around the house. Father Natale Olivieri came to her hometown of Santa Giulia in 1930 and was impressed with Bracco; he instructed her in catechism and also provided her with a range of religious texts for her to broaden her faith and her knowledge. She made her First Communion in the spring of 1931 and received her Confirmation on 2 October 1933. Bracco often stared at the Eucharist in times of Eucharistic Adoration – or in the tabernacle – in deep contemplation in order to draw strength from it. To that end she often rose in the mornings to walk over a kilometer in order to attend Mass. In 1933 she saw an image of Saint Dominic Savio in the "Bollettino Salesiano" with the late saint's motto: "Death rather than sin" and upon seeing it she exclaimed: "That applies to me too!" She cut out the image and then pasted it onto a card before hanging it over her bed – it remained a prized possession. She then began to read about his life and also liked to read the "External Maxims" that Saint Alphonsus Maria de' Liguori published and those of Saint Vincenzo Strambi. She also cultivated devotions to Saint Agnes of Rome and her town's patron Saint Julia of Corscia as well as Saint Cecilia and Saint Lucia.

In her adolescence she was noted for her modest speech and for her modest dress and was known to be timid and meek. Bracco disliked makeup though her attractiveness to men in her town saw them seek to walk with her in the fields or to Mass – she allowed this as a favor to them though remained reserved and modest in both action and thought. Her example became known when Father Olivieri often said: "Be like Teresa!" In Lent 1940 she meditated on the two themes of life and death after two Passionist priests preached on the topics. Her father died on 13 May 1944.

On 28 August 1944 she attended morning Mass at 7:00 a.m. and then went to work in the fields with her two sisters Anna and Adele when the three heard gunshots all of a sudden. At 9:00 a.m. partisans on the run warned them not to return to their home because the German soldiers were fast approaching and would pose a significant danger to the women though she wanted to return to help her mother hide and to take several possessions with her including a photograph of her late father.

The Nazi soldiers who had pushed back partisans entered her hometown of Santa Giulia and began to terrorize the residences while parading the partisans as their prisoners. At 3:00 p.m. the soldiers arrived and she hid behind a rock though was soon discovered. The Nazis kidnapped several other women in addition to Bracco. In the procession of those taken prisoner she met her cousin Enrichetta Ferrera and her infant – Ferrera gave her child to Bracco for a brief moment but Bracco handed the child back when it began to wail and anger the soldiers.

One soldier took her into the woods to rape her and she tried in vain to run to find help though was caught. The angered soldier strangled her – despite her best efforts to resist – and then shot her twice in the heart. He then stomped on her skull. Father Natele searched the woods and discovered her remains on 30 August alongside Bracco's sister. It was found that the murdered Bracco was on her back with her hands crossed over her chest – a bullet went through one hand and was lodged in her upper chest and there was a pale mark on her throat in addition to bruises on her face and bite marks across her arms and chest. Olivieri hurried to cover her remains and Doctor Scorza was summoned to confirm the death and examine what had occurred. Her funeral was celebrated on 31 August.

Her remains were exhumed on 10 May 1989 for canonical inspection as part of the beatification process that had been initiated.

== Beatification ==
The beatification process commenced on 15 April 1988 under Pope John Paul II after the Congregation for the Causes of Saints issued the official "nihil obstat" (nothing against) to the cause and titled her a Servant of God as the first stage in the process. Bishop Livio Maritano inaugurated the diocesan process on 20 June 1988 and later closed it not long after before the C.C.S. validated it – on 25 January 1991 – in Rome.

The official dossier known as the Positio was sent to the C.C.S. in 1993 and the theologians advising the latter approved the cause on 26 November 1996 while the cardinal and bishop members of the C.C.S. also approved the cause's merits on 15 April 1997. John Paul II issued his final approval on 7 July 1997 in a decree and on his pastoral visit to Turin beatified her on 24 May 1998.
