= Rumaythah ibn Abi Numayy =

14th century Emir of Mecca

Asad al-Dīn Rumaythah ibn Muḥammad Abī Numayy al-Akbar al-Ḥasanī (Arabic: أسد الدين رميثة بن محمد أبي نمي الحسني) was Emir of Mecca seven times between 1301 and 1345.

== Background ==
Rumaythah was one of 30 sons of Abu Numayy I, who ruled Mecca between 1254 and 1301. His laqab was Asad al-Din and his kunya was Abu Aradah. It is reported that he was also named Munajjad.

== First reign, in partnership with Humaydah ==
Rumaythah and his brother Humaydah were proclaimed as joint emirs in Safar 701 AH (October 1301), two days before Abu Numayy's death. They were initially opposed by a faction of the ashraf who supported their brothers Abu al-Ghayth and Utayfah. Humaydah emerged predominant and imprisoned Abu al-Ghayth and Utayfah. However, they managed to escape and when the hajj season arrived they gained the favor of the Egyptian emirs, chief among them Baybars al-Jashnakir. Consequently, in Dhu'l-Hijja 701 AH (August 1302), after the completion of the hajj rites, Baybars arrested Humaydah and Rumaythah, and installed their brothers to the throne. Baybars returned to Cairo in Muharram 702 AH, with Humaydah and Rumaythah in chains.

In 703 AH the brothers were released from prison. The sultan al-Nasir Muhammad dressed them in traditional Mamluk costume with kalafatah caps of zarkash (brocade). They were granted stipends, joined the ranks of the sultan's emirs, and rode with the sultan on the maydan (parade grounds).

== Second reign, in partnership with Humaydah ==
In 704 AH the shaykh Nasr al-Manbiji interceded for Humaydah and Rumaythah to forego Mamluk attire in favor of their own Hejazi dress. Later that year the sultan reappointed them to the emirate of Mecca, as he had become displeased with their brothers. They accompanied the annual hajj caravan from Cairo, and in Dhu al-Hijjah 704 AH (July 1305), after the completion of the hajj rites, Baybars al-Jashnakir arrested Abu al-Ghayth and Utayfah and installed Humaydah and Rumaythah to the throne.

Humaydah and Rumaythah initially acted justly and instituted popular policies including repeals of some of the mukus taxes. However in the following years they became guilty of various misdeeds and abuses. As a result, during the hajj of 710 AH (1311) they left Mecca to avoid an Egyptian force that was sent against them. In 712 AH (1313) they again abandoned Mecca when al-Nasir himself performed the pilgrimage with a large army. Finally, in Shawwal 713 AH (January/February 1314) al-Nasir dispatched an army to install Abu al-Ghayth to the throne, with 320 Mamluk cavalry and 500 horsemen from the Banu Husayn of Medina. The Egyptian emirs were Sayf al-Din Taqsuba al-Nasiri, Wali of Qus and commander of the army, Sayf al-Din Baktamur, Sarim al-Din Saruja al-Husami, and Ala al-Din Aydughdi al-Khwarizmi. They were joined from Damascus by the emir Sayf al-Din Balaban al-Tatari. When Humaydah and Rumaythah heard of the army's approach they fled towards Haly Bani Ya'qub.

== Third reign ==
On 3 Jumada II 715 AH (3 September 1315) Rumaythah arrived at the court of al-Nasir in Cairo. He received pardon from the sultan and sought support against Humaydah, who had deposed and killed Abu al-Ghayth. Al-Nasir sent Rumaythah back to the Hejaz with an army led by the emirs Najm al-Din Damurkhan ibn Qaraman and Sayf al-Din Taydamur al-Jamadar. Six days before the army's arrival, Humaydah loaded up a hundred camels with money and goods, burned what was left in the castle at Wadi Marr, and destroyed two thousand date palms. Then he made his way to al-Khalf wal-Khulayf, a castle six days journey from Mecca, and sought refuge with its master. Rumaythah and the Egyptians reached Mecca on Saturday, 15 Ramadan 715 (13 December 1315), then after two weeks they pursued Humaydah. They looted the castle at al-Khalf wal-Khulayf and captured Humaydah's wealth and 12-year-old son, who was handed over to Rumaythah, but Humaydah himself escaped to Iraq.

After the completion of the Hajj of 717 AH—either in late 717 or early 718 AH (February/March 1318)—Rumaythah was overthrown by his slaves and Humaydah assumed the Emirate. He replaced the name of al-Nasir in the khutbah with that of the Ilkhanid Sultan Abu Sa'id Bahadur Khan.

== Fourth reign ==
In Safar 718 AH (April 1318) al-Nasir sent an army to capture Humaydah led by the Emirs Sarim al-Din Uzbak al-Jurmaki, Sayf al-Din Bahadur al-Ibrahimi, and Badr al-Din Muhammad ibn Isa ibn al-Turkmani. They reached Mecca in late Rabi al-Awwal 718 AH (May 1318) and restored the Emirate to Rumaythah. On Tuesday, 14 Dhu al-Hijjah 718 AH (6 February 1319) the Emir Shams al-Din Aq Sunqur al-Nasiri arrested Rumaythah and al-Ibrahimi and took them prisoner back to Cairo. He alleged that Rumaythah had provided covert support to Humaydah and that al-Ibrahimi had intentionally allowed Humaydah to escape. Al-Ibrahimi was also accused of perpetrating other misdeeds in Mecca. After reaching Cairo in Muharram 719 AH (March 1319) Rumaythah received pardon from al-Nasir and was once again appointed to the ranks of the Sultan's emirs, with a monthly salary of 1000 dirhams. He was replaced as Emir of Mecca by his brother Utayfah. In Rabi al-Thani (June 1319) Rumaythah attempted to escape to the Hejaz. He was caught at Haql, returned to Cairo, and imprisoned.

== Fifth reign ==
After Humaydah's death in 720 AH (1320) al-Nasir released Rumaythah from prison. On 23 Dhu al-Qidah 720 AH (c. 25 December 1320) Rumaythah arrived in Mecca with the Vice-Sultan Sayf al-Din Arghun and was installed as co-Emir alongside Utayfah. In early 721 AH (1321) al-Nasir the Banu Hasan swore allegiance to Rumaythah, and Rumaythah began publicly supporting Zaydi Shi'ism in Mecca. In 726 AH (1326) al-Nasir summoned Rumaythah to Cairo, then ordered Utayfah to expel the Zaydi imam from Mecca. By the Hajj season Rumaythah had returned to Mecca, still serving as joint Emir. In 730 AH (1330) Rumaythah and Utayfah quarreled. That year Rumaythah did not meet the Egyptian amir al-rakab, nor was he invested with the annual robe of honor alongside his brother.

On Friday, 14 Dhu al-Hijjah 730 AH (28 September 1330) fighting in the Masjid al-Haram resulted in the death of Emir Aldamur al-Nasiri and a number of other pilgrims. Utayfah and his son Mubarak were involved in the fighting. In response al-Nasir decided to depose Utayfah and appoint Rumaythah as sole Emir of Mecca. The Egyptian army reached Mecca on 7 Rabi II (c. 17 January 1331) encountering no resistance, as Utayfah and Rumaythah had already fled the city with the rest of the ashraf in fear of al-Nasir's punishment.

== Sixth and seventh reigns ==
After negotiations with the Egyptian emirs, Rumaythah was proclaimed Emir of Mecca in the beginning of Jumada I 731 AH (c. 10 February 1331) and Utayfah was taken back to Egypt. In 734 AH (1333/1334) al-Nasir appointed Utayfah as joint Emir, but Rumaythah deposed him after the Hajj in August 1334. Utayfah returned with the Hajj the following year. In 736 AH (1335/1336) the brothers quarreled, and Utayfah established himself in Mecca while Rumaythah established himself at al-Jadid in Wadi Marr. On 28 Ramadan 736 AH (c. 11 May 1336) Rumaythah attacked Mecca in an attempt to unseat Utayfah. He was unsuccessful and a number of his men were killed, including his vizier. Neither Rumaythah nor Utayfah performed the Hajj that year.

In 737 AH (1336/1337) Rumaythah and Utayfah reconciled. After a trip to al-Wadiyayn in Yemen, they returned to Mecca in Sha'ban (March 1337). They then traveled to Egypt in response to summons from al-Nasir. On 10 Dhu al-Qi'dah (June 1337) Rumaythah returned to Mecca, having been confirmed as sole Emir of Mecca. Utayfah was detained in Egypt and would remain there until his death.

In 744 AH (1343/1345) Rumaythah was compelled to abdicate by his sons Thaqabah and Ajlan in exchange for 60,000 dirhams. Sultan al-Salih Isma'il summoned Thaqabah to Cairo and had him arrested, and in Dhu al-Qi'dah 744 AH (March/April 1344) sent a decree returning the Emirate to Rumaythah. Ajlan fled to Yemen, but he reconciled with Rumaythah after the departure of the Hajj.

In 746 AH al-Salih summoned Ajlan to Cairo and appointed him Emir of Mecca. He returned on 14 Jumada II (c. 11 October 1345) accompanied by 50 mamluks. On 18 Jumada al-Thani Rumaythah summoned Ajlan to the qubba of Zamzam where he formally abdicated.

Rumaythah died in Mecca on Friday, 8 Dhu al-Qi'dah 746 AH (3 March 1346). The janazah prayer was performed in the Masjid al-Haram at the time of Jumu'ah. When the Zaydi imam Abu al-Qasim ibn al-Shughayf came forward to officiate, he was prevented from doing so by the chief qadi Shihab al-Din al-Tabari, a Shafi'i. Although Ajlan was present, he did not interfere, and the prayer was led by al-Tabari.

== Issue ==
Rumaythah had at least five sons:

- Ahmad
- Sanad, Sharif of Mecca
- Thaqabah, Sharif of Mecca
- Ajlan, Sharif of Mecca
- Maghamis
