= Peter Tempesta =

- Count of Eboli, Count of Gravina
- Born: 1291
- Died: 29 August 1315 (aged 24)
- House: House of Anjou-Sicily
- Father: Charles II of Naples
- Mother: Maria of Hungary

Peter (1291 – 29 August 1315), called Tempesta (meaning "storm"), was the Count of Eboli from 1306. He was the eighth son of Charles II of Naples and Maria of Hungary (see Elizabeth of Sicily). His sobriquet came from his stormy temperament.

In 1309, he received Nocera and Isernia and exchanged Montescaglioso for Sorrento and Castellammare di Stabia. He began serving his brother, King Robert, against the Ghibellines of Uguccione della Faggiuola in Tuscany. He led 300 knights and was given the title of "Vicar of Tuscany, Lombardy, Romagna, the city of Bertinoro, and the city of Ferrara and Captain-General of the Guelph party of Tuscany".

He celebrated a jubilee at Siena and then moved on to Florence, where he stayed with the Mozzi family and the commune granted him a stipend of 4,000 florins. He took Arezzo on 29 September 1314, but Uguccione took Lucca. At Robert's request, Peter brought reinforcements north and met with initial successes. At the Battle of Montecatini, his forces were defeated by Uguccione and the Ghibellines, and Peter was killed.

== Ancestry ==
Ancestors of Peter Tempesta

16. Philip II of France
8. Louis VIII of France
17. Isabelle of Hainaut
4. Charles I of Naples
18. Alfonso VIII of Castile
9. Blanche of Castile
19. Eleanor of England
2. Charles II of Naples
20. Alfonso II, Count of Provence
10. Ramon Berenguer IV, Count of Provence
21. Gersenda II of Sabran
5. Beatrice of Provence
22. Thomas I of Savoy
11. Beatrice of Savoy
23. Margaret of Geneva
1. Peter Tempesta
24. Andrew II of Hungary
12. Béla IV of Hungary
25. Gertrude of Merania
6. Stephen V of Hungary
26. Theodore I Laskaris
13. Maria Laskarina
27. Anna Angelina
3. Maria of Hungary
28. Suthoi, Khan of Cumania
14. Kuthen, Khan of Cumania
7. Elizabeth the Cuman

== Sources ==
- Ghisalberti, Alberto M. Dizionario Biografico degli Italiani: III Ammirato – Arcoleo. Rome, 1961.
- Kelly, Samantha (2003). The New Solomon: Robert of Naples (1309-1343) and Fourteenth-Century Kingship. Brill.
