= Inan ibn Mughamis =

Former ruler of Mecca

Zayn al-Dīn Abu Lijām ‘Inān ibn Mughāmis ibn Rumaythah ibn Abī Numayy al-Ḥasanī (Arabic: زين الدين أبو لجام عنان بن مغامس بن رميثة بن أبي نمي الحسني) was Emir of Mecca twice. He died in Egypt in Rabi' al-Awwal 805 AH (1402). His cousin, Ali ibn Mubarak, was his co-Emir of Mecca during one of his reign, in the other, Aqil ibn Mubarak
