= Muhammad ibn Utayfah =

Emir of Mecca from 1359 to 1360

Muhammad ibn ‘Uṭayfah ibn ibn Muḥammad Abī Numayy al-Ḥasanī (Arabic: محمد بن عطيفة بن محمد أبي نمي الحسني) was Emir of Mecca in partnership with his cousin Sanad ibn Rumaythah from 1359 to 1360.
