= Battle of Montecatini =

1315 battle between the Republic of Pisa and allied Naples and Florence

- Part of the Wars of the Guelphs and Ghibellines
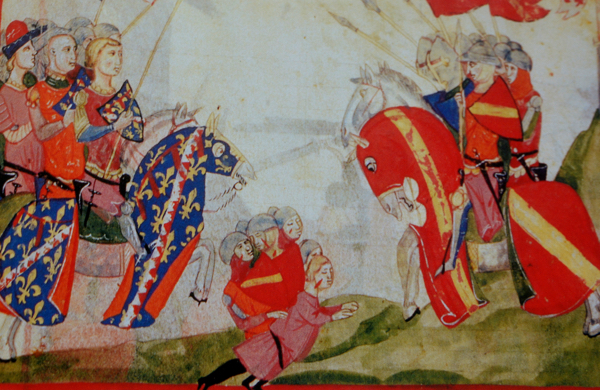
Date	29 August 1315
Location	Montecatini Terme, Val di Nievole
Result	Pisan victory

Belligerents
Republic of Pisa	Republic of Florence; Kingdom of Naples

Commanders and leaders
Uguccione della Faggiuola	Philip I of Taranto; Peter, Count of Eboli and Gravina †

Strength
3,000 cavalry 20,000 infantry	3,200 cavalry 30,000–60,000 infantry

The Battle of Montecatini was fought in the Val di Nievole on 29 August 1315 between the Republic of Pisa, and the forces of both the Kingdom of Naples and the Republic of Florence. The Ghibelline army of Pisa, commanded by Uguccione della Faggiuola, won a victory over the Guelph armies of the Florentines and their allies. The Neapolitan forces, made up of 3200 cavalry and 30,000–60,000 infantry, were commanded by Philip I of Taranto, while the Pisan forces consisted of 3000 cavalry and 20,000 infantry.

Philip survived the battle, his eldest son Charles of Taranto and his brother Peter, Count of Eboli and Gravina, were both killed in the fight. Additional deaths included members of 114 Florentine noble families. Francesco della Faggiuola, son of Uguccione, was killed possibly in personal combat with Charles of Taranto.

== Sources ==
- Armstrong, Edward (1932). "Italy in the Time of Dante". In Gwatkin, Henry Melvill; Whitney, James Pounder; Tanner, Joseph Robson; Previté-Orton, Charles William; Brooke, Zachary Nugent (eds.). The Cambridge Medieval History. Vol. 7: Decline of Empire and Papacy. Cambridge University Press.
- Kelly, Samantha (2003). The New Solomon: Robert of Naples (1309–1343) and Fourteenth-Century Kingship. Brill.
