= Mughamis ibn Rumaythah =

Mughāmis ibn Rumaythah ibn Muḥammad Abī Numayy al-Ḥasanī (Arabic: مغامس بن رميثة بن محمد أبي نمي الحسني) was a co-Emir of Mecca from 1347 to 1349.
