= Utayfah ibn Abi Numayy =

14th-century Emir of Mecca

Sayf al-Dīn ‘Uṭayfah ibn Muḥammad Abī Numayy al-Ḥasanī (Arabic: سيف الدين عطيفة بن محمد أبي نمي الحسني) was an Emir of Mecca. He died in Egypt in 743 AH (1342/1343).
