= Sanad ibn Rumaythah =

Sanad ibn Rumaythah ibn ibn Muḥammad Abī Numayy al-Ḥasanī (Arabic: سند بن رميثة بن محمد أبي نمي الحسني) was Emir of Mecca in partnership with his cousin Muhammad ibn Utayfah from 1359 to 1360.
