= Uguccione della Faggiuola =

13/14th-century Italian mercenary and magistrate

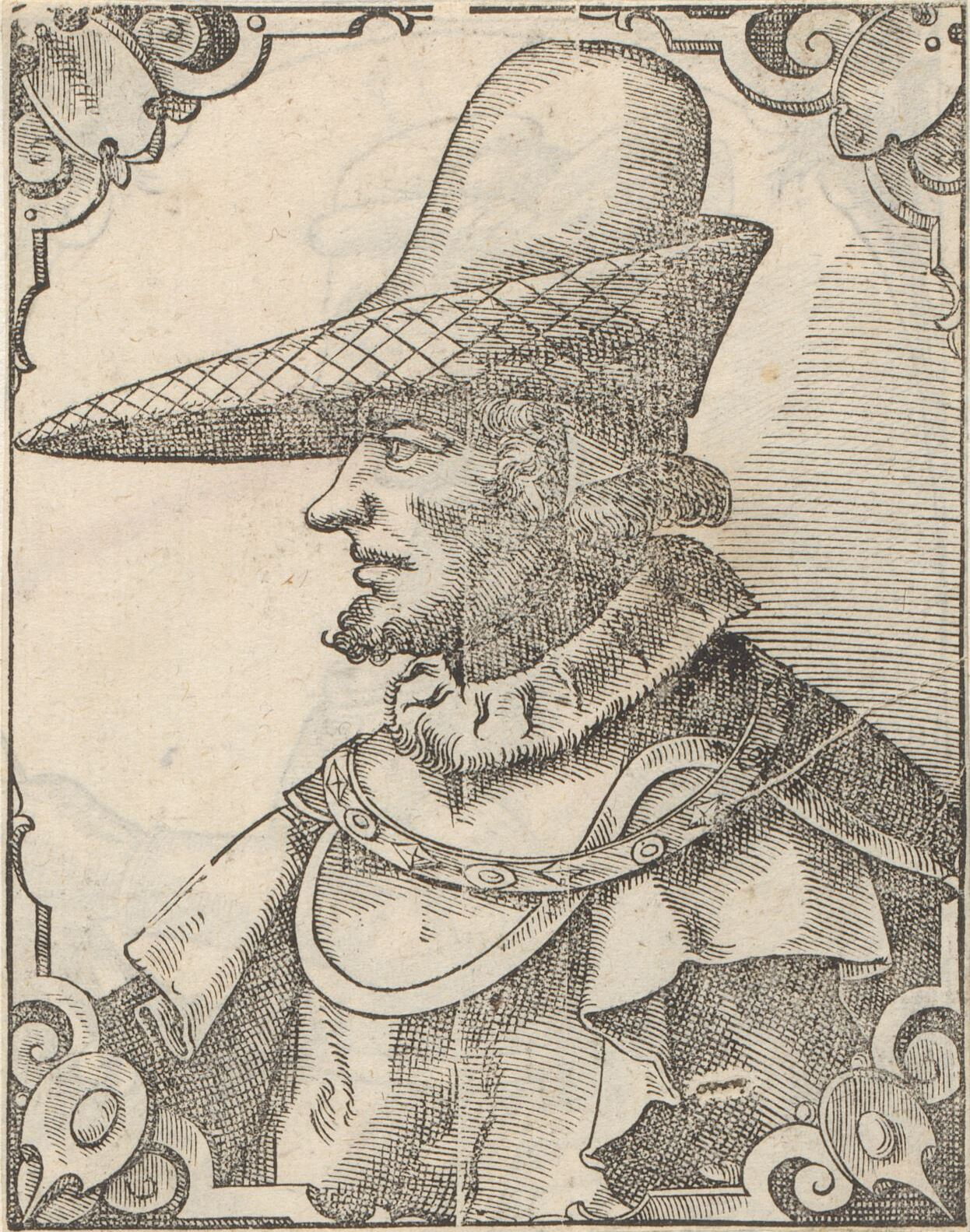
- Portrait of Uguccione della Faggiuola by Tobias Stimmer
- Born: c. 1250; Casteldelci
- Died: 1 November 1319 (aged 68–69); Vicenza
- Burial place: Sant'Anastasia, Verona
- Military career
- Allegiance: Holy Roman Empire; Republic of Pisa; Lords of Verona
- Conflicts: Battle of Montecatini

Uguccione della Faggiuola (c. 1250 – 1 November 1319) was an Italian condottiero, and Ghibelline magistrate of Pisa, Lucca and Forlì (from 1297).

== Biography ==
Uguccione was born at Casteldelci and came to prominence in the late 13th century as captain for the Aretine army, when he successfully captured Cesena. In 1297, he attempted to conquer Forlì but was unsuccessful.

Of Ghibelline association, in 1311–1312 Uguccione was imperial vicar in Genoa for the Holy Roman Emperor Henry VII, who came to Pisa in 1312. (Note: Hunt refers to Uguccione as "dictator of Pisa".) After the latter's death in 1313, Uguccione was made chief magistrate (podestà), captain of the people, and virtual lord of Pisa. From 1314 to 1316, Pisa became the center of Ghibelline activity under Uguccione's rule.

Uguccione sacked Lucca in 1314 with the help of his protégé Castruccio Castracani. On 29 August 1315 he delivered the Guelphs of Florence and their Angevin associates from Naples their worst defeat since 1260 in the Battle of Montecatini in the Val di Nievole.

In 1316 risings in Pisa and Lucca drove Uguccione out and he took refuge under Cangrande della Scala, who made Uguccione podestà of Vicenza.

Uguccione died of malaria during the siege of Padua on 1 November 1319.

== Sources ==
- Armstrong, Edward (1932). "Italy in the Time of Dante". In Gwatkin, Henry Melvill; Whitney, James Pounder; Tanner, Joseph Robson; Previté-Orton, Charles William; Brooke, Zachary Nugent (eds.). The Cambridge Medieval History. Vol. 7: Decline of Empire and Papacy. Cambridge University Press.
- Beattie, Blake R. (2006). Angelus Pacis: The Legation of Cardinal Giovanni Gaetano Orsini, 1326–1334. Brill.
- Epstein, Steven (1996). Genoa and the Genoese, 958–1528. University of North Carolina Press.
- Hunt, Edwin S. (1994). The Medieval Super-Companies: A Study of Peruzzi Company of Florence. Cambridge University Press.

Preceded by To Bologna	Lord of Imola; 1296–1299	Succeeded by To the Papal States
Preceded by Republic	Lord of Pisa; 1314–1316	Succeeded by Gaddo della Gherardesca
Preceded by Commune	Lord of Lucca; 1314–1316	Succeeded by Castruccio Castracani
