= Tang dynasty =

Imperial dynasty of China (618–907)

Tang 唐
- 618–690; 705–907
The empire in 661, when it reached its greatest extent
Civil administration
Military administration
Briefly-controlled areas (Note: In the west, the Kunling, Mengchi, Sogdiana and Tokharistan protectorates were the former territories of the Western Turks, placed under puppet rulers in 657–661 and overthrown in 665. The borders are very approximate.) (Note: In Korea, the Ungjin Commandery was established in 660. The Tang conquered Goguryeo in northern Korea in 668, but were expelled from the peninsula in 671.)
- Capital: Chang'an (618–690, 705–904); Luoyang (904–907)
- Common languages: Middle Chinese; Literary Chinese (official)
- Religion: Majorities: Chinese Buddhism; Taoism; Chinese folk religion; Minorities: Nestorian Christianity; Chinese Manichaeism; Zoroastrianism; Islam
- Government: Absolute monarchy
- Emperor
  - 618–626 (first): Emperor Gaozu
  - 626–649: Emperor Taizong
  - 712–756: Emperor Xuanzong
  - 904–907 (last): Emperor Ai
- Historical era: Medieval East Asia
  - Established: June 18, 618
  - Wu Zhou interregnum: 690–705
  - An Lushan rebellion: 755–763
  - Huang Chao Rebellion: 874-884
  - Abdication in favour of Later Liang: June 1, 907

Area
- 715: 5,400,000 km^{2} (2,100,000 sq mi)

Population
  - 7th century: 50 million
  - 9th century: 80 million
- Currency: Cash coins
Preceded by
Sui dynasty
Western Turkic Khaganate
Eastern Turkic Khaganate
Succeeded by
Later Liang
Yang Wu
Wuyue
Min
Former Shu
Liao dynasty
Second Turkic Khaganate

Chinese name
- Chinese: 唐朝
- Hanyu Pinyin: Tángcháo
Transcriptions
Standard Mandarin
- Hanyu Pinyin: Tángcháo
- Bopomofo: ㄊㄤˊ ㄔㄠˊ
- Wade–Giles: Tʻang^{2}-chʻao^{2}
- Tongyong Pinyin: Táng-cháo
- IPA: [tʰǎŋ.ʈʂʰǎʊ]
Wu
- Romanization: Daon zau
Yue: Cantonese
- Yale Romanization: Tòhngchìuh
- Jyutping: Tong4 ciu4
- IPA: [tʰɔŋ˩.tsʰiw˩]
Southern Min
- Hokkien POJ: Tông-tiâu
- Tâi-lô: Tông-tiâu
Middle Chinese
- Middle Chinese: dang djew

The Tang dynasty was an imperial dynasty of China that ruled from 618 to 907, with an interregnum between 690 and 705. It was preceded by the Sui dynasty and followed by the Five Dynasties and Ten Kingdoms period. Historians generally regard the Tang as a high point of Chinese civilisation, and a golden age of cosmopolitan culture. Tang territory, acquired through the military campaigns of its early rulers, surpassed that of the Han dynasty.

The Li family founded the dynasty after taking advantage of a period of Sui decline and precipitating their final collapse, in turn inaugurating a period of progress and stability in the first half of the dynasty's rule. The dynasty was formally interrupted from 690 to 705 when Empress Wu Zetian seized the throne, proclaiming the Wu Zhou dynasty and becoming the only legitimate Chinese female emperor. The An Lushan rebellion (755–763) led to devastation and the decline of central authority during the latter half of the dynasty. The Tang maintained a civil-service system by recruiting scholar-officials through standardised examinations and recommendations to office. The rise of regional military governors known as jiedushi during the 9th century undermined civil order. The dynasty and central government went into decline by the latter half of the 9th century; agrarian rebellions resulted in mass population loss and displacement, widespread poverty, and further government dysfunction that ultimately ended the dynasty in 907.

The Tang capital at Chang'an (present-day Xi'an) was the world's most populous city for much of the dynasty's existence. Two censuses of the 7th and 8th centuries estimated the empire's population at about 50 million people, which grew to an estimated 80 million by the dynasty's end. (Note: During the rule of the Tang, the world population grew from approximately 190 million to approximately 240 million, a difference of 50 million. See also medieval demography.) The dynasty raised professional and conscripted armies of hundreds of thousands of troops to contend with nomadic powers for control of Inner Asia and the lucrative trade-routes along the Silk Road. Far-flung kingdoms and states paid tribute to the Tang court, while the Tang also indirectly controlled several regions through a protectorate system. In addition to its political hegemony, the Tang exerted a powerful cultural influence over neighbouring East Asian nations such as Japan and Korea.

Chinese culture flourished and further matured during the Tang era. It is traditionally considered the greatest age for Chinese poetry. Two of China's most famous poets, Li Bai and Du Fu, belonged to this age, contributing with poets such as Wang Wei to the monumental Three Hundred Tang Poems. Many famous painters such as Han Gan, Zhang Xuan, and Zhou Fang were active, while Chinese court music flourished with instruments such as the popular pipa. Tang scholars compiled a rich variety of historical literature, as well as encyclopaedias and geographical works. Notable innovations included the development of woodblock printing. Buddhism became a major influence in Chinese culture, with native Chinese sects gaining prominence. However, in the 840s, Emperor Wuzong enacted policies to suppress Buddhism, which subsequently declined in influence.

== History ==
Portrait of Emperor Gaozu of Tang (566–635) dating to the Ming dynasty (1368–1644)

=== Establishment ===
The Tang dynasty was founded by Emperor Gaozu (born Li Yuan). He was previously the Duke of Tang and governor of Taiyuan, the capital of modern Shanxi, during the collapse of the Sui dynasty (581–618). The House of Li had ethnic Han origins, and it belonged to the northwest military aristocracy prevalent during the Sui dynasty. According to official Tang records, they were paternally descended from Laozi, the traditional founder of Taoism (whose personal name was Li Dan or Li Er), the Han dynasty general Li Guang, and Li Gao, the founder of the Han-ruled Western Liang kingdom. This family was known as the Longxi Li lineage, which also included the prominent Tang poet Li Bai. The Tang emperors were partially of Xianbei ancestry, as Emperor Gaozu of Tang's mother Duchess Dugu was part-Xianbei.

Some historians have argued that the Tang imperial family's ties to the distinguished Longxi Li clan of Han descent may be fabricated. Howard J. Wechsler notes that it has been suggested that the Tang House of Li was descended from a minor offshoot of the eastern Li clan of Zhaojun in Hebei that had intermarried substantially with non-Han tribal aristocracy. Chen Sanping argues that the House of Li had a patrilineal Xianbei lineage that was concealed by the royal family through modifying their genealogy. This argument is partially based on a comparison with Li Xian, a Northern Zhou general, whose epitaph states that he was both descended from the Han dynasty general Li Ling and Yidigui, a 10th generation ancestor who came from the steppes. However, a genetic study of the daughter of the Duke of Longxi (Li Hu), the Tang founder's paternal grandfather, and her nuclear family shows that they were primarily related to agricultural farming communities in northern China (95.8%–97.3%) with minor admixture with Eurasian Steppe pastoralists (2.7%–4.2%). The family's haplogroups are common in Han and East Asian populations and atypical in Xianbei individuals. Despite possessing Xianbei names (Bulugu and Daye), the findings suggest that they were likely Han aristocrats, reflecting the historical policy of granting Xianbei names to Han elites in Western Wei.

Li Yuan had prestige and military experience, and was a first cousin of Emperor Yang of Sui through their mothers, both of whom were one of the Dugu sisters). Li Yuan rose in rebellion in 617, along with his son and his equally militant daughter Princess Pingyang (d. 623), who raised and commanded her own troops. In winter 617, Li Yuan occupied Chang'an, relegated Emperor Yang to the position of Taishang Huang ('retired emperor'), and acted as regent to the puppet child-emperor Yang You. On the news of Emperor Yang's murder by General Yuwen Huaji on June 18, 618, Li Yuan declared himself emperor of the newly founded Tang dynasty.

Emperor Gaozu ruled until 626, when he was forcefully deposed by his son Li Shimin, the Prince of Qin. Li Shimin had commanded troops since the age of 18, had prowess with bow and arrow, sword and lance and was known for his effective cavalry charges. Fighting a numerically superior army, he defeated Dou Jiande (573–621) at Luoyang in the Battle of Hulao on May 28, 621. Due to fear of assassination, Li Shimin ambushed and killed two of his brothers, Li Yuanji (b. 603) and crown prince Li Jiancheng (b. 589), in the Xuanwu Gate Incident on July 2, 626. Shortly thereafter, his father abdicated in his favour, and Li Shimin ascended the throne. He is conventionally known by his temple name Taizong.

Although killing two brothers and deposing his father contradicted the Confucian value of filial piety, Taizong showed himself to be a capable leader who listened to the advice of the wisest members of his council. In 628, Emperor Taizong held a Buddhist memorial service for the casualties of war; in 629, he had Buddhist monasteries erected at the sites of major battles so that monks could pray for the fallen on both sides of the fight.

During the Tang campaign against the Eastern Turks, the Eastern Turkic Khaganate was destroyed after the capture of its ruler, Illig Qaghan by the famed Tang military officer Li Jing (571–649), who later became a Chancellor of the Tang dynasty. With this victory, the Turks accepted Taizong as their khagan, a title rendered as Tian Kehan in addition to his rule as emperor of China under the traditional title "Son of Heaven". Taizong was succeeded by his son Li Zhi (as Emperor Gaozong) in 649.

Tang circuits (道; dào) in 742 according to The Cambridge History of China

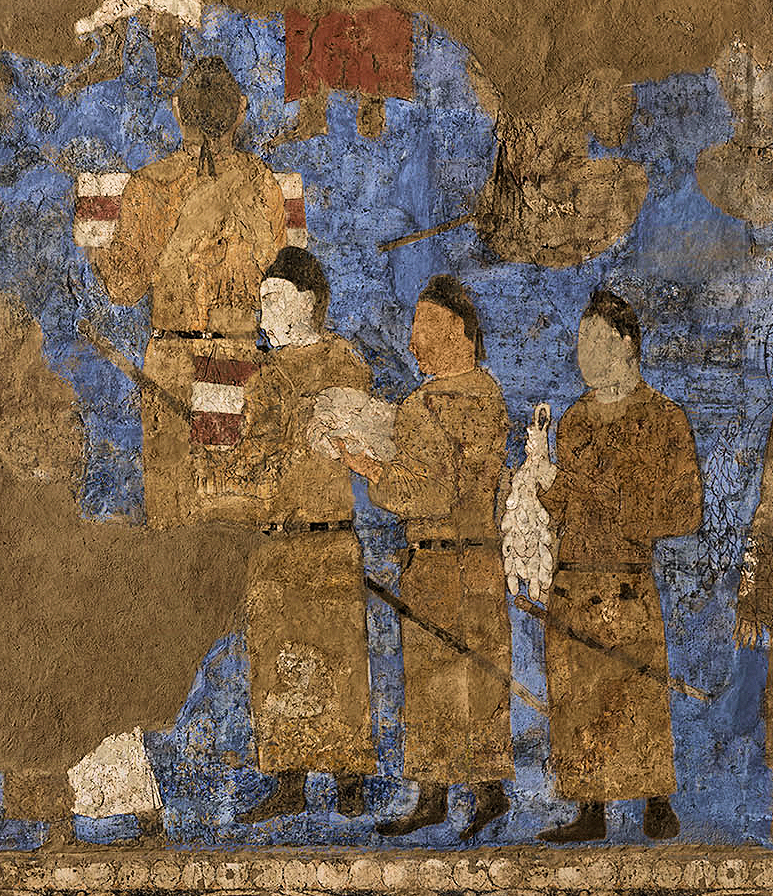
Tang emissaries to the Sogdian king Varkhuman in Samarkand (648–651) – Afrasiab murals

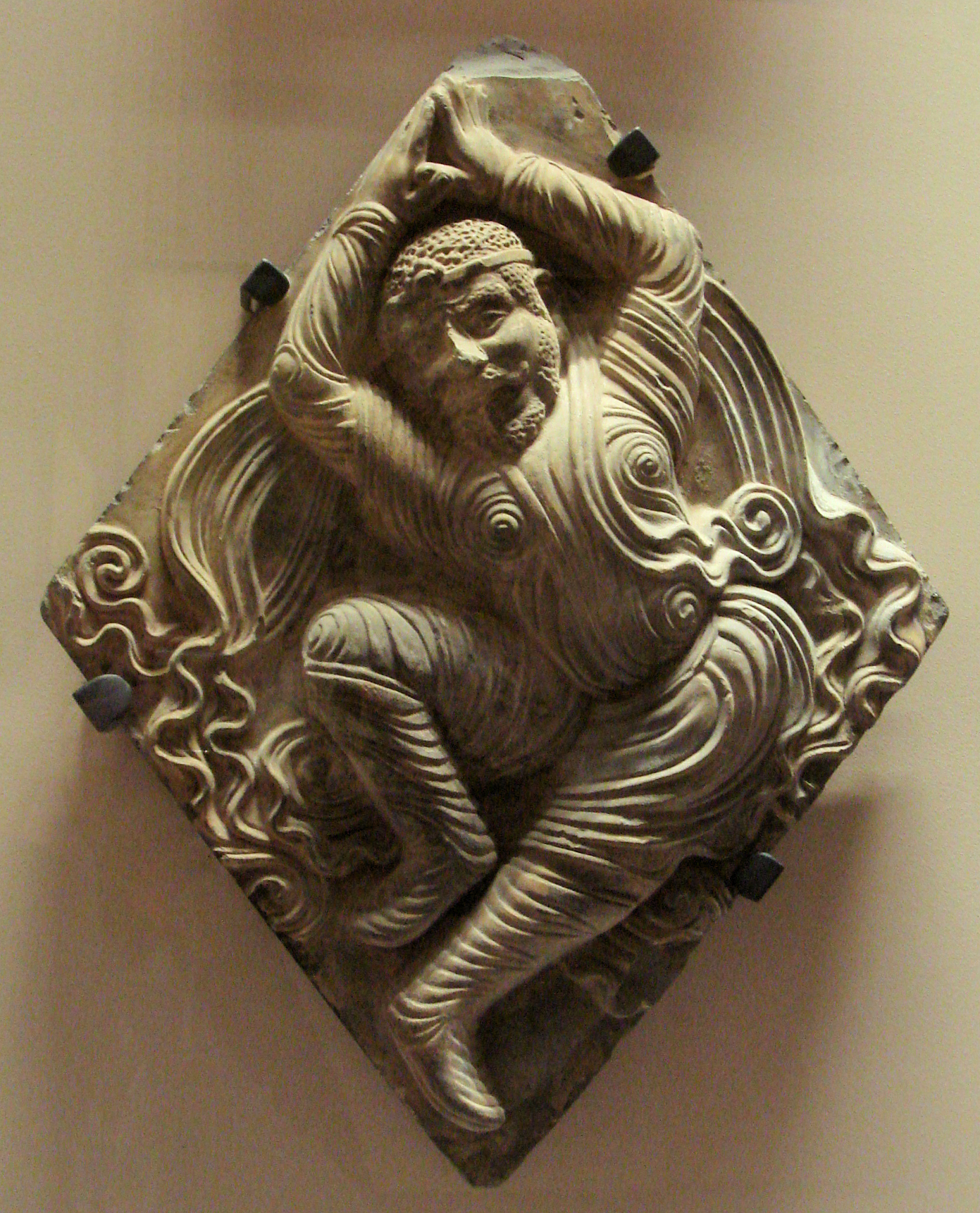
7th-century Sogdian Huteng dancer – Xiuding temple pagoda, Anyang, Henan

The Tang engaged in military campaigns against the Western Turks, exploiting the rivalry between Western and Eastern Turks in order to weaken both. Under Emperor Taizong, campaigns were dispatched in the Western Regions against Gaochang in 640, Karasahr in 644 and 648, and Kucha in 648. The wars against the Western Turks continued under Emperor Gaozong, and the Western Turkic Khaganate was finally annexed after General Su Dingfang's defeat of Khagan Ashina Helu in 657. Around this time, the Tang court enjoyed visits by numerous dignitaries from foreign lands. These were depicted in the Portraits of Periodical Offering, probably painted by Yan Liben (601–673). (Note: From right to left are representatives hailing from Lu (魯國)—a reference to the Eastern Wei—Rouran (芮芮國), Persia (波斯國), Baekje (百濟國), Kumedh (胡密丹), Baiti (白題國), Mohe people (靺國), Central India (中天竺), Sri Lanka (獅子國), Northern India (北天竺), Tashkurgan (謁盤陀), Wuxing of the Chouchi ((武興國), Kucha ((龜茲國), Japan (倭國), Goguryeo (高麗國), Khotan (于闐國), Silla (新羅國), Dangchang (宕昌國), Langkasuka (狼牙修), Dengzhi (鄧至國), Yarkand (周古柯), Kabadiyan (阿跋檀), the "Barbarians of Jianping" (建平蠻), and Nudan (女蜑國).)

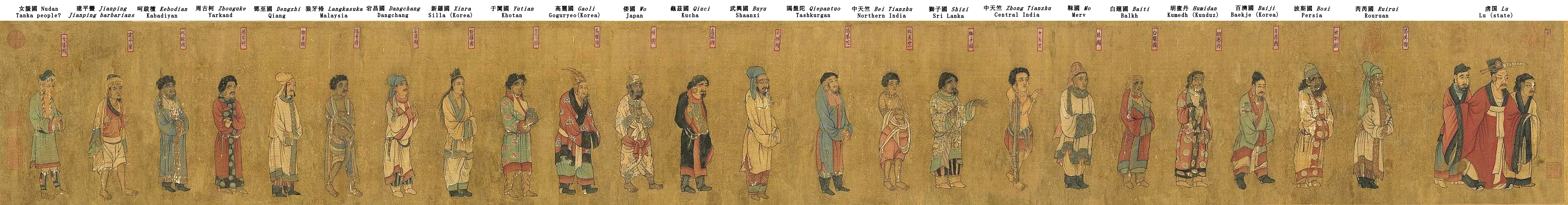
Foreign ambassadors visiting the Tang court – the Portraits of Periodical Offering by Yan Liben (601–673)

=== Wu Zetian's usurpation ===
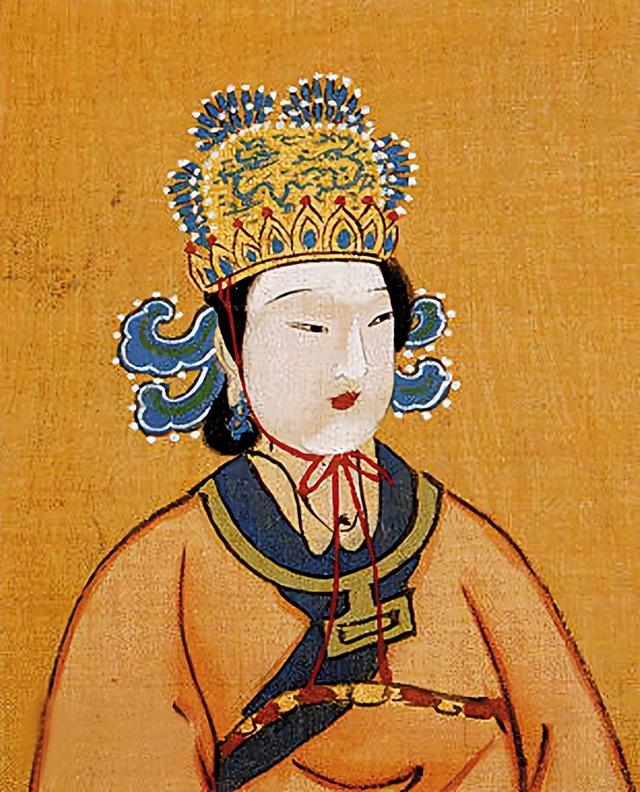
Wu Zetian, the sole recognised empress regnant in Chinese history

Having entered Emperor Gaozong's court as a lowly consort, Wu Zetian ultimately acceded to the highest position of power in 690, establishing the short-lived Wu Zhou. Emperor Gaozong suffered a stroke in 655, and Wu began to make many of his court decisions for him, discussing affairs of state with his councillors, who took orders from her while she sat behind a screen. When Empress Wu's eldest son, the crown prince, began to assert his authority and advocate policies opposed by Empress Wu, he suddenly died in 675. Many suspected he was poisoned by Empress Wu. Although the next heir apparent kept a lower profile, Wu accused him of plotting a rebellion in 680; he was banished and later obliged to commit suicide.

In 683, Emperor Gaozong died and was succeeded by Emperor Zhongzong, his eldest surviving son by Wu. Zhongzong tried to appoint his wife's father as chancellor: after only six weeks on the throne, he was deposed by Empress Wu in favour of his younger brother, Emperor Ruizong. This provoked a group of Tang princes to rebel in 684. Wu's armies suppressed them within two months. She proclaimed the Tianshou era of Wu Zhou on October 16, 690, and three days later demoted Emperor Ruizong to crown prince. He was also forced to give up his father's surname Li in favour of the Empress Wu. She then ruled as China's only empress regnant in history.

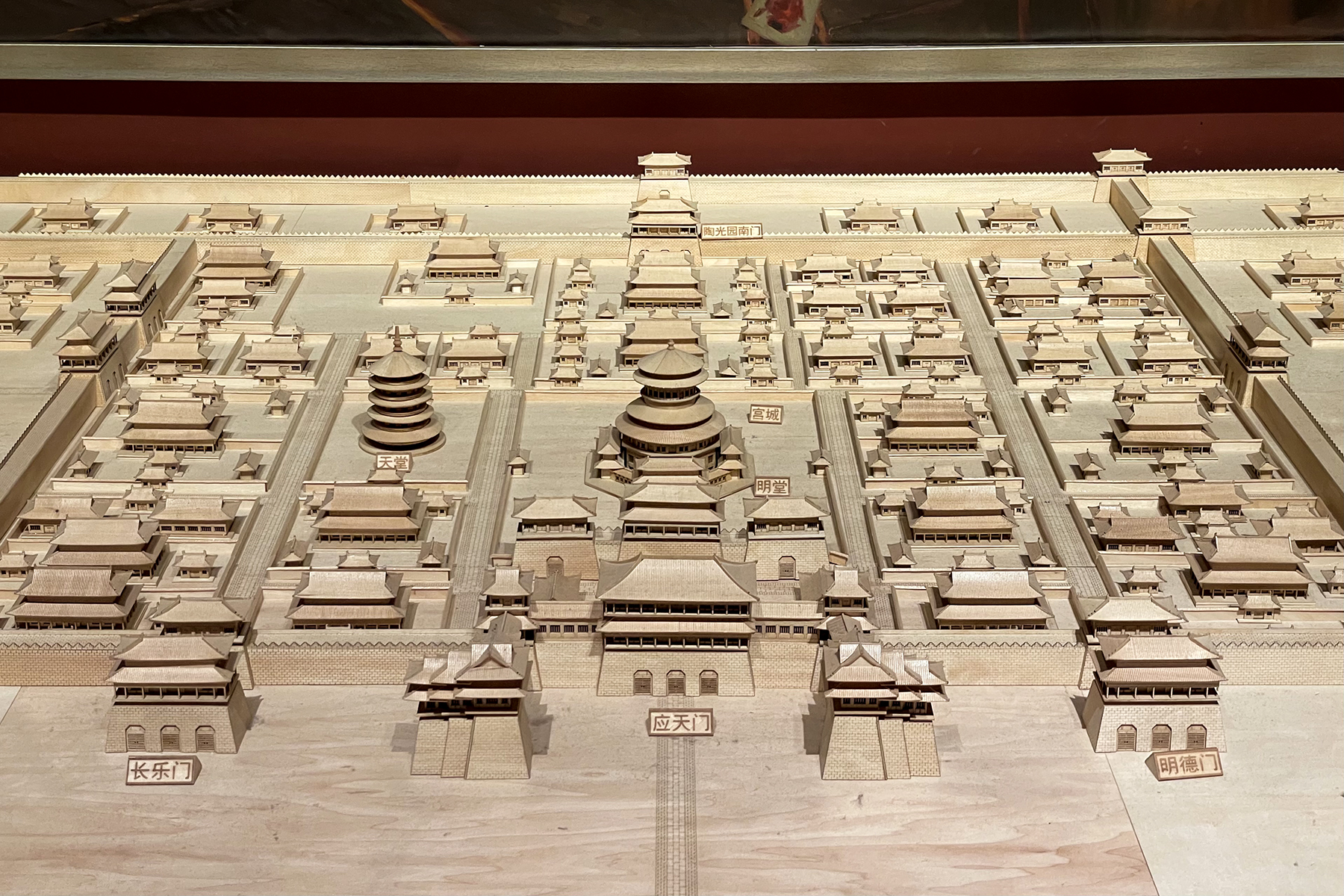
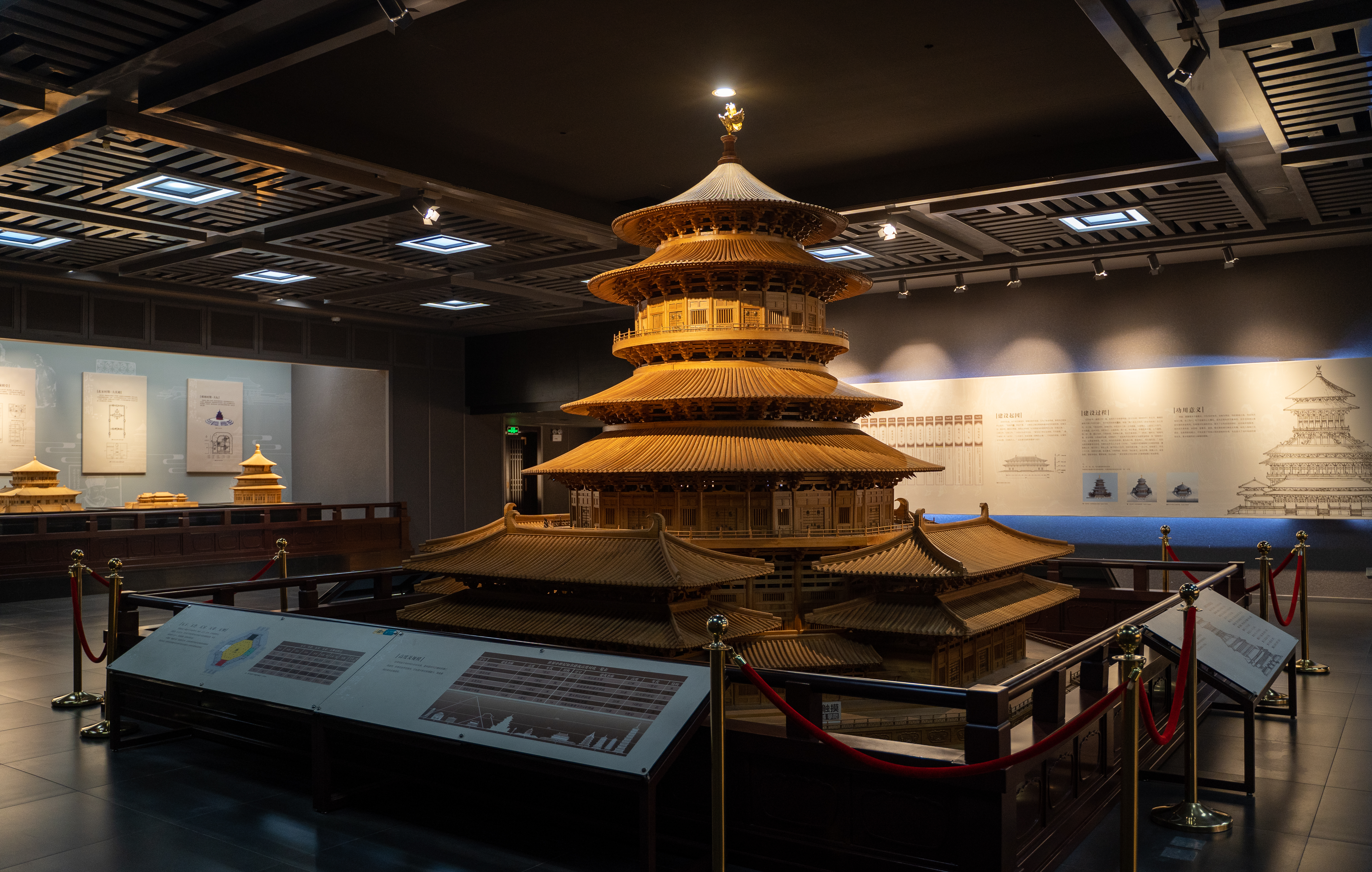
Model of Luoyang imperial palace during Wu Zetian's reign. Many major construction projects were commissioned during Wu Zetian's time, such as the Bright Hall of Luoyang (right) commissioned by Wu Zetian (original 93 m (305 ft) tall).

A palace coup (Shenlong Coup) on February 20, 705, forced Empress Wu to yield her position on February 22. The next day, her son Zhongzong was restored to power; the Tang was formally restored on March 3. She died soon after. To legitimise her rule, she circulated a document known as the Great Cloud Sutra, which predicted that a reincarnation of the Maitreya Buddha would be a female monarch who would dispel illness, worry, and disaster from the world. She even introduced numerous revised written characters for the language, though they reverted to the original forms after her death. Arguably the most important part of her legacy was diminishing the hegemony of the Northwestern aristocracy, allowing people from other clans and regions of China to become more represented in Chinese politics and government.

=== Emperor Xuanzong's reign ===
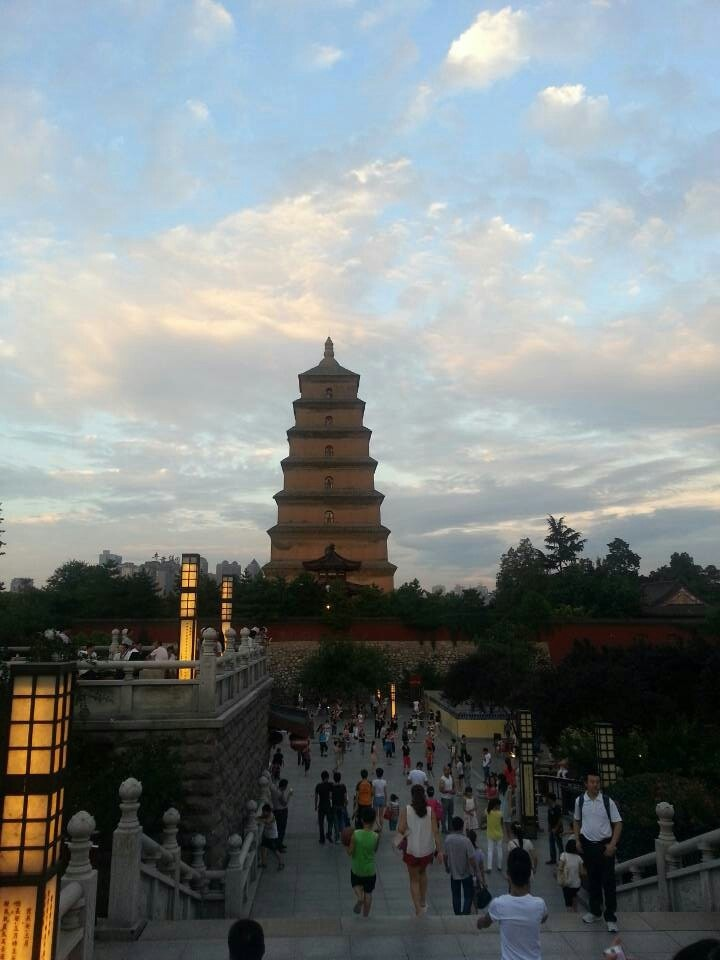
The Giant Wild Goose Pagoda in Chang'an, built in 652 and repaired by Wu Zetian in 704

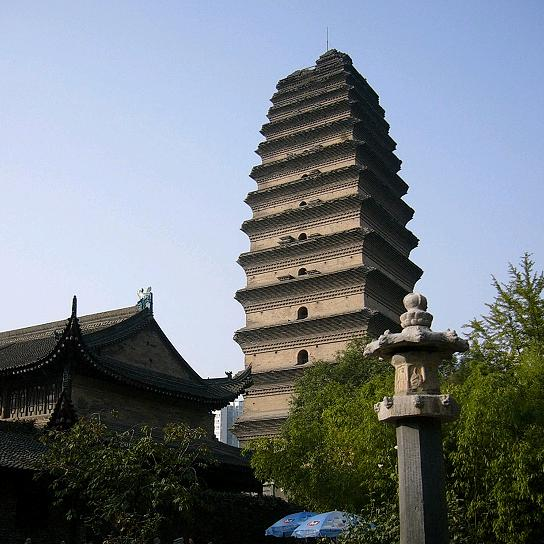
The Small Wild Goose Pagoda, built by 709, was adjacent to the Dajianfu Temple in Chang'an, where Buddhist monks gathered to translate Sanskrit texts into Chinese

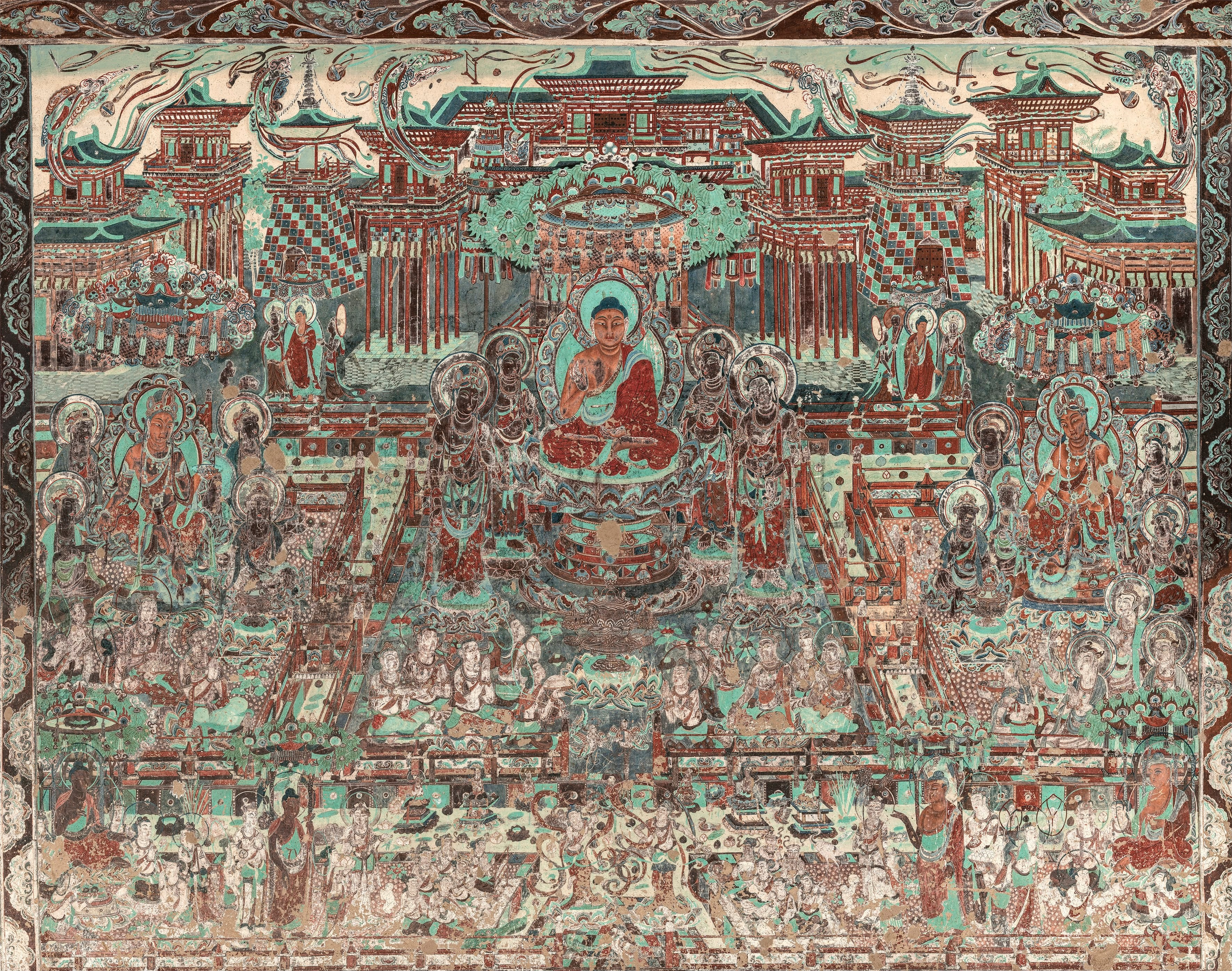
Mural depicting Tang architecture constructed in 707–710 – Mogao Grotto Cave 217

There were many prominent women at court during and after Wu's reign, including Shangguan Wan'er (664–710), a poet, writer, and trusted official in charge of Wu's private office. In 706, the wife of Emperor Zhongzong of Tang, Empress Wei (d. 710), persuaded her husband to staff government offices with his sister and her daughters, and in 709 requested that he grant women the right to bequeath hereditary privileges to their sons (which before was a male right only). Empress Wei eventually poisoned Zhongzong, whereupon she placed his fifteen-year-old son upon the throne in 710. Two weeks later, Li Longji (the later Emperor Xuanzong) entered the palace with a few followers and slew Empress Wei and her faction. He then installed his father Emperor Ruizong (r. 710–712) on the throne. Just as Emperor Zhongzong was dominated by Empress Wei, so too was Ruizong dominated by Princess Taiping. This ended when Princess Taiping's coup failed in 712, and Emperor Ruizong abdicated to Emperor Xuanzong.

The Tang reached its height during Emperor Xuanzong's 44-year reign, which has been characterized as a golden age of economic prosperity and pleasant lifestyles within the imperial court. Xuanzong was seen as a progressive and benevolent ruler, having abolished the death penalty in 747. Previously, all executions had to be approved by the emperor; in 730, there were only 24 executions. Xuanzong bowed to the consensus of his ministers on policy decisions and made efforts to staff government ministries fairly with different political factions. His staunch Confucian chancellor Zhang Jiuling (673–740) worked to reduce deflation and increase the money supply by upholding the use of private coinage, while his aristocratic and technocratic successor Li Linfu (d. 753) favoured government monopoly over the issuance of coinage. After 737, most of Xuanzong's confidence rested in Li Linfu, his long-standing chancellor, who championed a more aggressive foreign policy employing non-Chinese generals. This policy ultimately created the conditions for a massive rebellion against Xuanzong.

=== An Lushan rebellion and catastrophe ===
Previously at the height of their power, the An Lushan rebellion (755–763) ultimately destroyed the prosperity of the Tang. An Lushan was a half-Sogdian, half-Turkic Tang commander since 744, who had experience fighting the Khitans of Manchuria with a victory in 744, yet most of his campaigns against the Khitans were unsuccessful. He was given great responsibility in Hebei, which allowed him to rebel with an army of more than 100,000 troops. After capturing Luoyang, he named himself emperor of a new, but short-lived, Yan state. Despite early victories scored by the Tang general Guo Ziyi (697–781), the newly recruited troops of the army at the capital were no match for An Lushan's frontier veterans; the court fled Chang'an. While the heir apparent raised troops in Shanxi and Xuanzong fled to Sichuan, they called upon the help of the Uyghur Khaganate in 756. The Uyghur khan Moyanchur was greatly excited at this prospect, and married his own daughter to the Chinese diplomatic envoy once he arrived, receiving in turn a Chinese princess as his bride. The Uyghurs helped recapture the Tang capital from the rebels, but they refused to leave until the Tang paid them an enormous sum of tribute in silk. Even Abbasid Arabs assisted the Tang in putting down the rebellion. A massacre of foreign Arab and Persian Muslim merchants by Tian Shengong happened during the An Lushan rebellion in the 760 Yangzhou massacre. The Tibetans took hold of the opportunity and raided many areas under Chinese control, and even after the Tibetan Empire had fallen apart in 842, followed soon after by the Uyghur Kingdom of Qocho, the Tang were in no position to reconquer Central Asia after 763. So significant was this loss that half a century later jinshi examination candidates were required to write an essay on the causes of the Tang's decline. Although An Lushan was killed by one of his eunuchs in 757, this time of troubles and widespread insurrection continued until rebel Shi Siming was killed by his own son in 763.

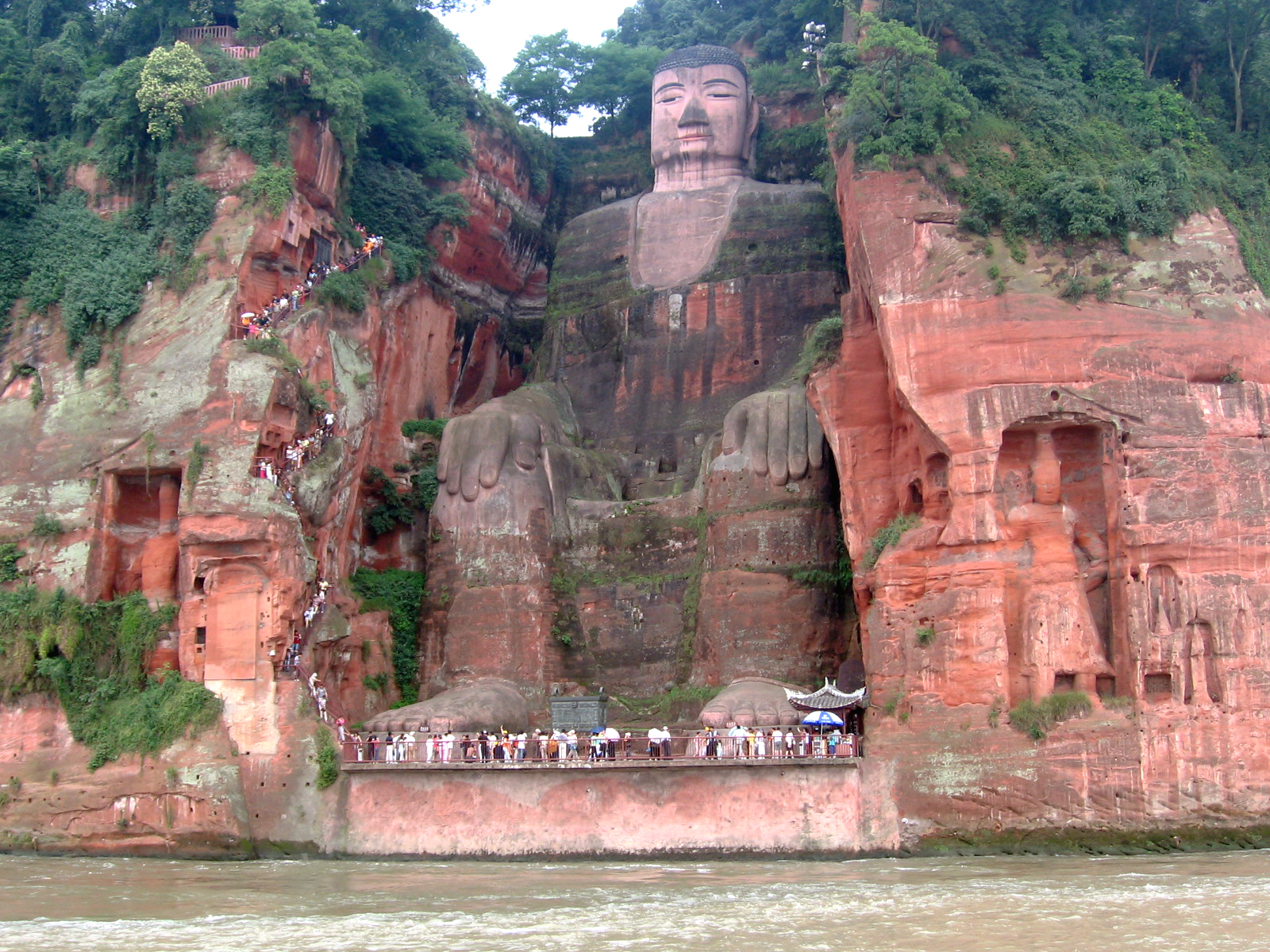
Construction of the Leshan Giant Buddha began in 713 and was completed in 803. The statue is 71 m (233 ft) high.

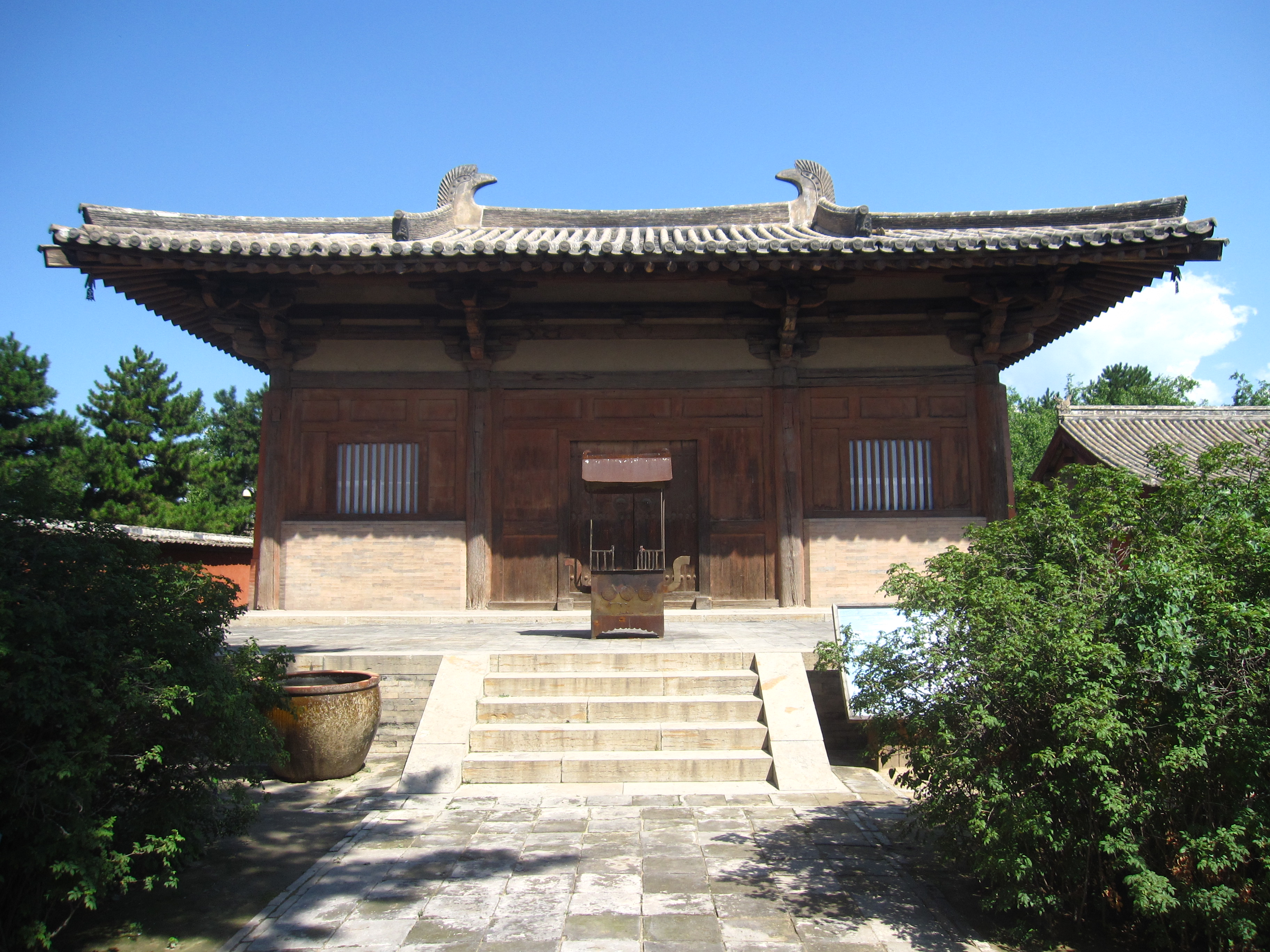
The Nanchan Temple built during the late 8th century

After 710, regional military governors called jiedushi gradually came to challenge the power of the central government. After the An Lushan rebellion, the autonomous power and authority accumulated by the jiedushi in Hebei went beyond the central government's control. After a series of rebellions between 781 and 784 in present-day Hebei, Henan, Shandong, and Hubei, the government had to officially acknowledge the jiedushi's hereditary rule without accreditation. The Tang government relied on these governors and their armies for protection and to suppress local revolts. In return, the central government would acknowledge the rights of these governors to maintain their army, collect taxes and even to pass on their title to heirs. As time passed, these military governors slowly phased out the prominence of civil officials drafted by exams, and became more autonomous from central authority. The rule of these powerful military governors lasted until 960, when a new civil order under the Song dynasty was established. The abandonment of the equal-field system also meant that people could buy and sell land freely; many poor fell into debt because of this and were forced to sell their land to the wealthy, which led to the exponential growth of large estates. With the breakdown of the land allocation system after 755, the central Chinese state barely interfered in agricultural management and acted merely as tax collector for roughly a millennium, save a few instances such as the Song's failed land nationalisation during the 13th-century war with the Mongols.

With the central government collapsing in authority over the various regions of the empire, it was recorded in 845 that bandits and river pirates in parties of 100 or more began plundering settlements along the Yangtze River with little resistance. In 858, massive floods along the Grand Canal inundated vast tracts of land and terrain of the North China Plain, which drowned tens of thousands of people in the process. The Chinese belief in the Mandate of Heaven granted to the ailing Tang was also challenged when natural disasters led many to believe that the Tang had lost their right to rule. In 873, a disastrous harvest shook the foundations of the empire; in some areas only half of all agricultural produce was gathered, and tens of thousands faced famine and starvation. In the earlier period of the Tang, the central government was able to meet crises in the harvest—from 714 to 719, records show that the Tang government responded effectively to natural disasters by extending the price-regulation granary system throughout the country. The central government was able then to build a large surplus stock of foods to ward off the rising danger of famine and increased agricultural productivity through land reclamation.

=== Rebuilding and recovery ===
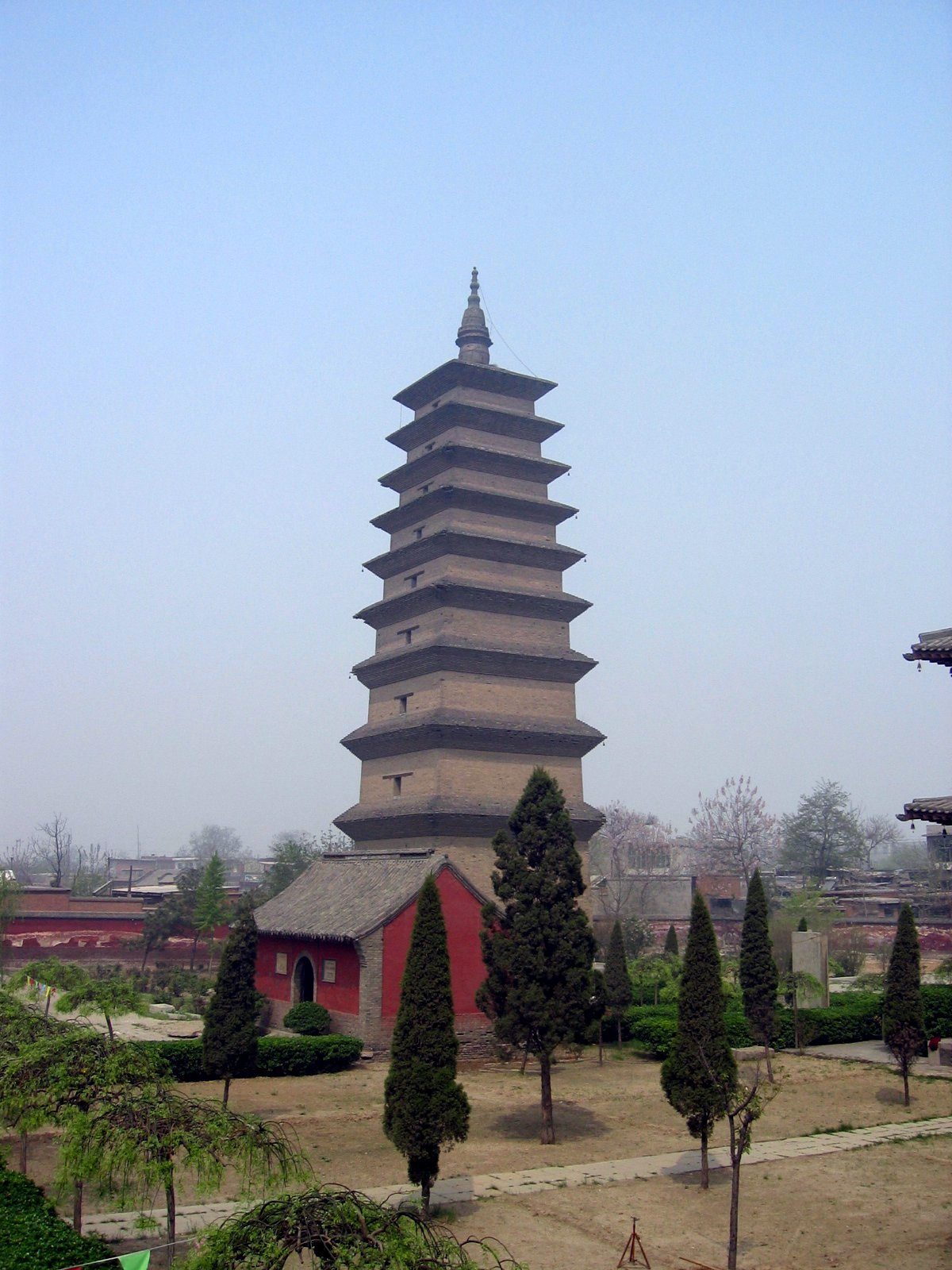
Xumi Pagoda, built in 636

Although these natural calamities and rebellions stained the reputation and hampered the effectiveness of the central government, the early 9th century is nonetheless viewed as a period of recovery for the Tang. The government's withdrawal from its role in managing the economy had the unintended effect of stimulating trade, as more markets with fewer bureaucratic restrictions were opened up. By 780, the old grain tax and labour service of the 7th century were replaced by a semi-annual tax paid in cash, signifying the shift to a money economy boosted by the merchant class. Cities in the southern Jiangnan region such as Yangzhou, Suzhou, and Hangzhou prospered the most economically during the late Tang period. The government monopoly on salt production, weakened after the An Lushan rebellion, was placed under the Salt Commission, which became one of the most powerful state agencies, run by capable ministers chosen as specialists. The commission began the practice of selling merchants the rights to buy monopoly salt, which they transported and sold in local markets. In 799, salt accounted for over half of the government's revenues. S. A. M. Adshead writes that this salt tax represents "the first time that an indirect tax, rather than tribute, levies on land or people, or profit from state enterprises such as mines, had been the primary resource of a major state". Even after the power of the central government was in decline after the mid-8th century, it was still able to function and give out imperial orders on a massive scale. The Old Book of Tang (945) recorded that a government decree issued in 828 standardised the use of square-pallet chain pumps for irrigation throughout the country.

The last ambitious ruler of the Tang was Emperor Xianzong (r. 805–820), whose reign was aided by the fiscal reforms of the 780s, including a government monopoly on the salt industry. He also had an effective and well-trained imperial army stationed at the capital led by his court eunuchs; this was the Army of Divine Strategy, numbering 240,000 in strength as recorded in 798. Between 806 and 819, Emperor Xianzong conducted seven major military campaigns to quell the rebellious provinces that had claimed autonomy from central authority, managing to subdue all but two of them. Under his reign, there was a brief end to the hereditary jiedushi, as Xianzong appointed his own military officers and staffed the regional bureaucracies once again with civil officials. However, Xianzong's successors proved less capable and more interested in the leisure of hunting, feasting, and playing outdoor sports, allowing eunuchs to amass more power as drafted scholar-officials caused strife in the bureaucracy with factional parties. The eunuchs' power was not challenged following the Ganlu Incident, where Emperor Wenzong (r. 826–840) failed in his plot to have them overthrown; instead, Wenzong's allies were publicly executed in Chang'an's West Market on the eunuchs' command.

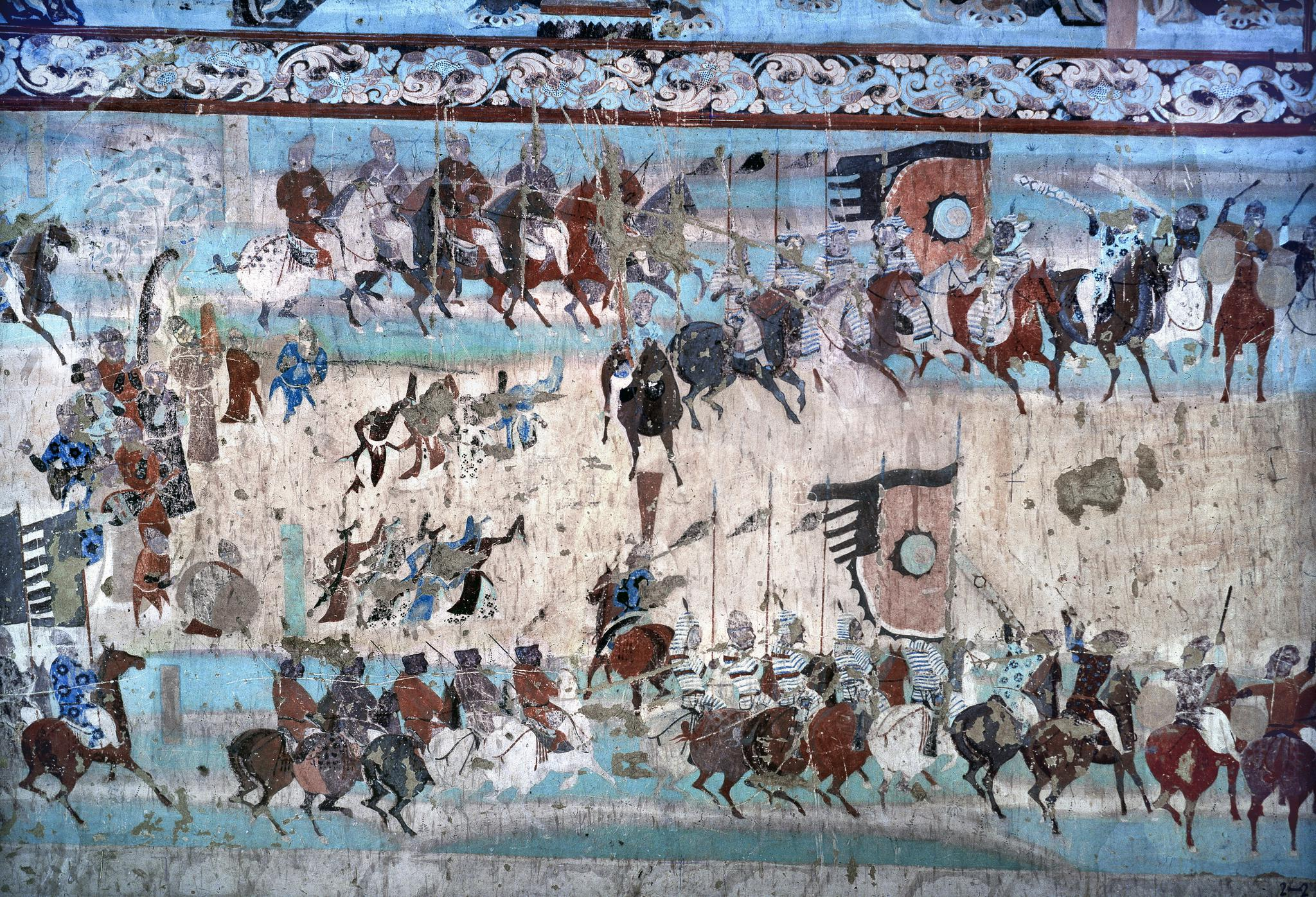
A late Tang mural commemorating the victory of General Zhang Yichao over the Tibetan Empire in 848 – from Mogao cave 156

Decades after the An Lushan rebellion, the Tang was able to muster enough power to launch offensive military campaigns, including its destruction of the Uyghur Khaganate in Mongolia from 840 to 847. The Tang managed to restore indirect control over former territories as far west as the Hexi Corridor and Dunhuang in Gansu; in 848, the general Zhang Yichao (799–872) managed to wrestle control of the region from the Tibetan Empire during its civil war. Shortly afterwards, Emperor Xuanzong of Tang (r. 846–859) acknowledged Zhang as the protector (防禦使; fángyùshǐ) of Sha Prefecture, and military governor of the new Guiyi Circuit.

=== End of the dynasty ===
In addition to factors like natural calamity and jiedushi claiming autonomy, a rebellion by Huang Chao (874–884) devastated both northern and southern China, took an entire decade to suppress, and resulted in the sacking of both Chang'an and Luoyang. In 878–879, Huang's army committed a massacre in the southern port of Guangzhou against foreign Arab and Persian Muslim, Zoroastrian, Jewish and Christian merchants. A medieval Chinese source claimed that Huang Chao killed eight million people. The Tang never recovered from Huang's rebellion, which paved the way for the later overthrow of the dynasty. Large groups of bandits in the size of small armies ravaged the countryside in the last years of Tang. They smuggled illicit salt, ambushed merchants and convoys, and even besieged several walled cities.

Although older accounts described the Huang Chao uprising as marking the "destruction" of the Tang aristocracy, recent scholarship shows that the decline of the aristocratic advantage in officeholding had been underway long before the rebellion. Furthermore, the exact extent of the physical damage of the rebellion to the Tang elite has also been overstated. Zhou Ding (2024) argues that numerous clans re-established themselves in the Jiangnan and other southern provinces, maintaining local influence well into the tenth century. Amid the sacking of cities and continuing factional strife among eunuchs and officials, however, the court's fiscal and administrative collapse left many of the old metropolitan families impoverished or displaced, setting the stage for the emergence of a new regional gentry under the Five Dynasties and Song.

During the last two decades of the Tang dynasty, the gradual collapse of central authority led to the rise of the rival military figures Li Keyong and Zhu Wen in northern China. Tang forces had defeated Huang's rebellion with the aid of allied Shatuo, a Turkic people of what is now Shanxi, led by Li Keyong. He was made a jiedushi, and later Prince of Jin, bestowed with the imperial surname Li by the Tang court. Zhu Wen, originally a salt smuggler who served as a lieutenant under the rebel Huang Chao, surrendered to Tang forces. By helping to defeat Huang, he was renamed Zhu Quanzhong ("Zhu of Perfect Loyalty") and granted a rapid series of promotions to military governor of Xuanwu Circuit.

In 901, from his power base of Kaifeng, Zhu Wen seized control of the Tang capital Chang'an and with it the imperial family. By 903, he forced Emperor Zhaozong of Tang to move the capital to Luoyang, preparing to take the throne for himself. In 904, Zhu assassinated Emperor Zhaozong to replace him with the emperor's young son Emperor Ai of Tang. In 905, Zhu executed the brothers of Emperor Ai as well as many officials and Empress Dowager He. In 907, the Tang dynasty was ended when Zhu deposed Ai and took the throne for himself (known posthumously as Emperor Taizu of Later Liang). He established the Later Liang, which inaugurated the Five Dynasties and Ten Kingdoms period. A year later, Zhu had the deposed Emperor Ai poisoned to death.

Zhu Wen's enemy Li Keyong died in 908, having never claimed the title of emperor out of loyalty to the Tang. His son Li Cunxu (Emperor Zhuangzong) inherited his title Prince of Jin along with his father's rivalry against Zhu. In 923, Li Cunxu declared a "restored" Tang dynasty, the Later Tang, before toppling the Later Liang dynasty the same year. However, southern China remained splintered into various small kingdoms until most of China was reunified under the Song dynasty (960–1279). Control over parts of northeast China and Manchuria by the Liao dynasty of the Khitan people also stemmed from this period. In 905, their leader Abaoji formed a military alliance with Li Keyong against Zhu Wen but the Khitans eventually turned against the Later Tang, helping another Shatuo leader Shi Jingtang of Later Jin to overthrow Later Tang in 936.

== Administration and politics ==
=== Initial reforms ===
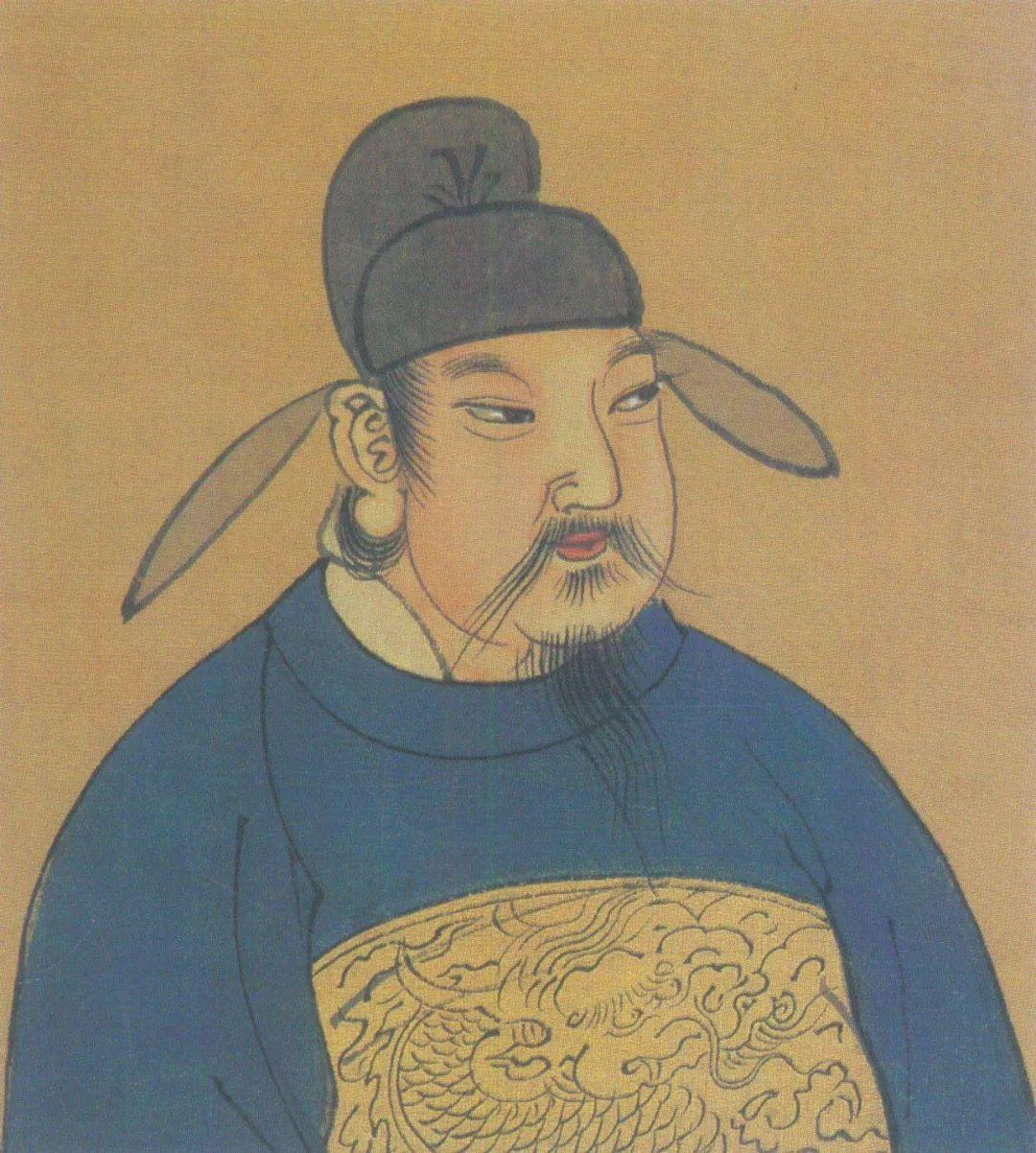
Emperor Xuanzong of Tang wearing the robes and hat of a scholar

Taizong set out to solve the internal problems within the government that had constantly plagued past dynasties. Building upon the Sui legal code, he issued a new legal code that subsequent Chinese dynasties would model theirs upon, as well as neighbouring polities in Vietnam, Korea, and Japan. The earliest law code to survive was established in 653; it was divided into 500 articles specifying different crimes and penalties ranging from ten blows with a light stick, one hundred blows with a heavy rod, exile, penal servitude, or execution. The legal code distinguished different levels of severity in meted punishments when different members of the social and political hierarchy committed the same crime. For example, the severity of punishment was different when a servant or nephew killed a master or an uncle than when a master or uncle killed a servant or nephew.

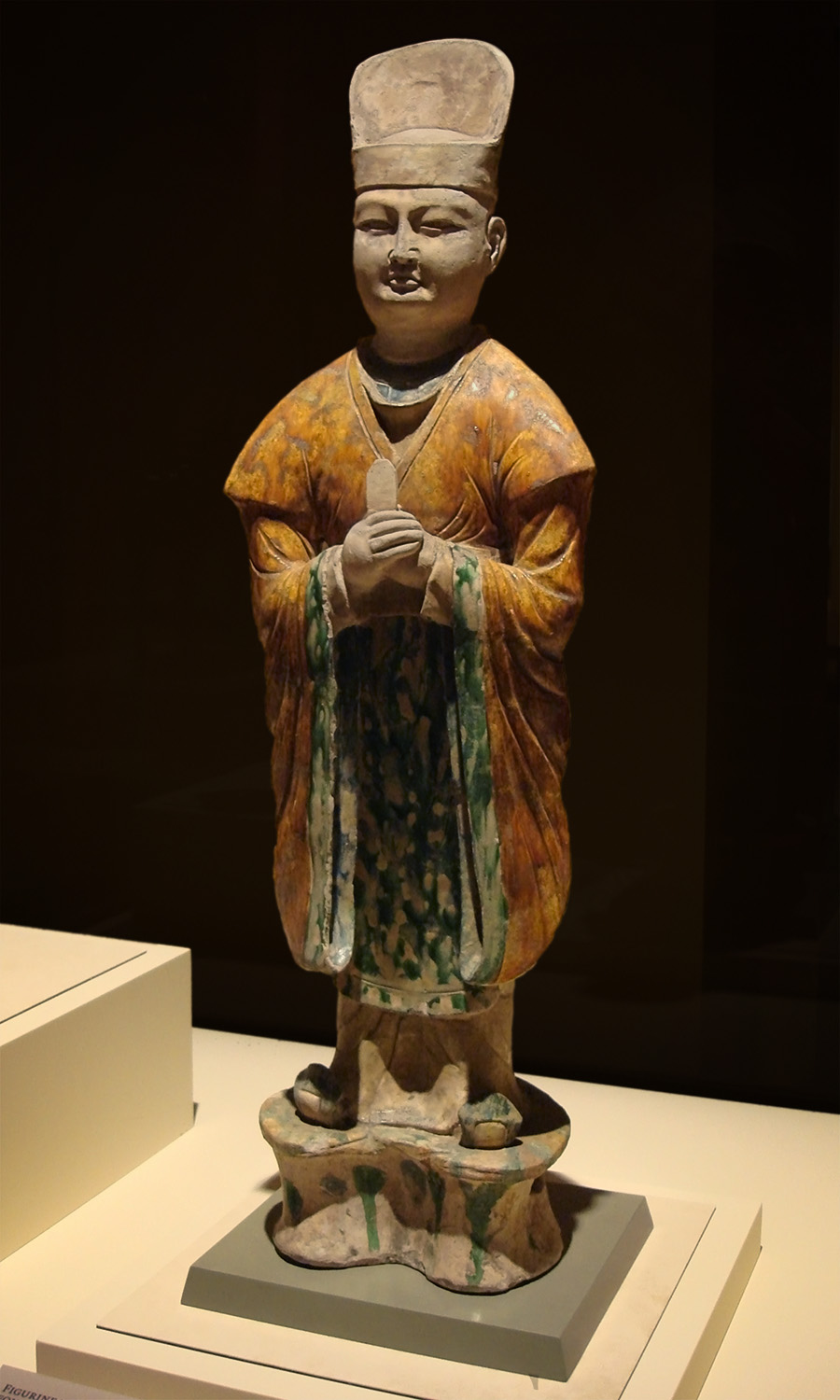
Tang tomb figure of an official dressed in hanfu. He is depicted with a tall hat, wide-sleeved belted outer garment, and a rectangular "kerchief" in front. A white inner gown hangs over his square shoes, and he holds a tablet containing a report to his superiors to his chest.

The Tang Code was largely retained by later codes such as the early Ming dynasty (1368–1644) code of 1397, yet there were several revisions in later times, such as improved property rights for women during the Song dynasty (960–1279).

The Tang had three departments (省; shěng), each of which was obliged to draft, review, and implement policies. There were also six ministries (部; bù) under the administrations that implemented policy, each of which was assigned different tasks. These Three Departments and Six Ministries included the personnel administration, finance, rites, military, justice, and public works—an administrative model which lasted until the fall of the Qing dynasty (1644–1912).

Although the founders of the Tang dynasty drew on the glory of the earlier Han dynasty (202 BC – 220 AD), the basis for much of their administrative organisation was very similar to that of the previous Northern and Southern dynasties. The Northern Zhou (6th century) fubing system of divisional militia was continued by the Tang, along with farmer-soldiers serving in rotation from the capital or frontier in order to receive appropriated farmland. The equal-field system of the Northern Wei (4th–6th centuries) was also maintained, though with a few modifications.

Although the central and local governments kept extensive records of land property to assess taxes, it became common practice in the Tang for literate and affluent people to create their own private documents and sign contracts. These had their own signature, along with those of a witness and a scribe, to prove in court (if necessary) that their claim to the property was legitimate. The prototype of this actually existed in the ancient Han dynasty, while contractual language became even more common and was embedded in Chinese literary culture in later dynasties.

The centre of the political power of the Tang was the capital city of Chang'an (modern Xi'an), where the emperor maintained his large palace quarters and entertained political emissaries with music, sports, acrobats, poetry, paintings, and dramatic theatre performances. The capital was also filled with incredible wealth and resources to spare. When the Chinese prefectural government officials travelled to the capital in 643 to present the annual report on the affairs in their districts, Emperor Taizong discovered that many had no proper quarters to rest in and were renting rooms from merchants. Therefore, Emperor Taizong ordered the government agencies responsible for municipal construction to build each visiting official his own private mansion in the capital.

=== Imperial examinations ===
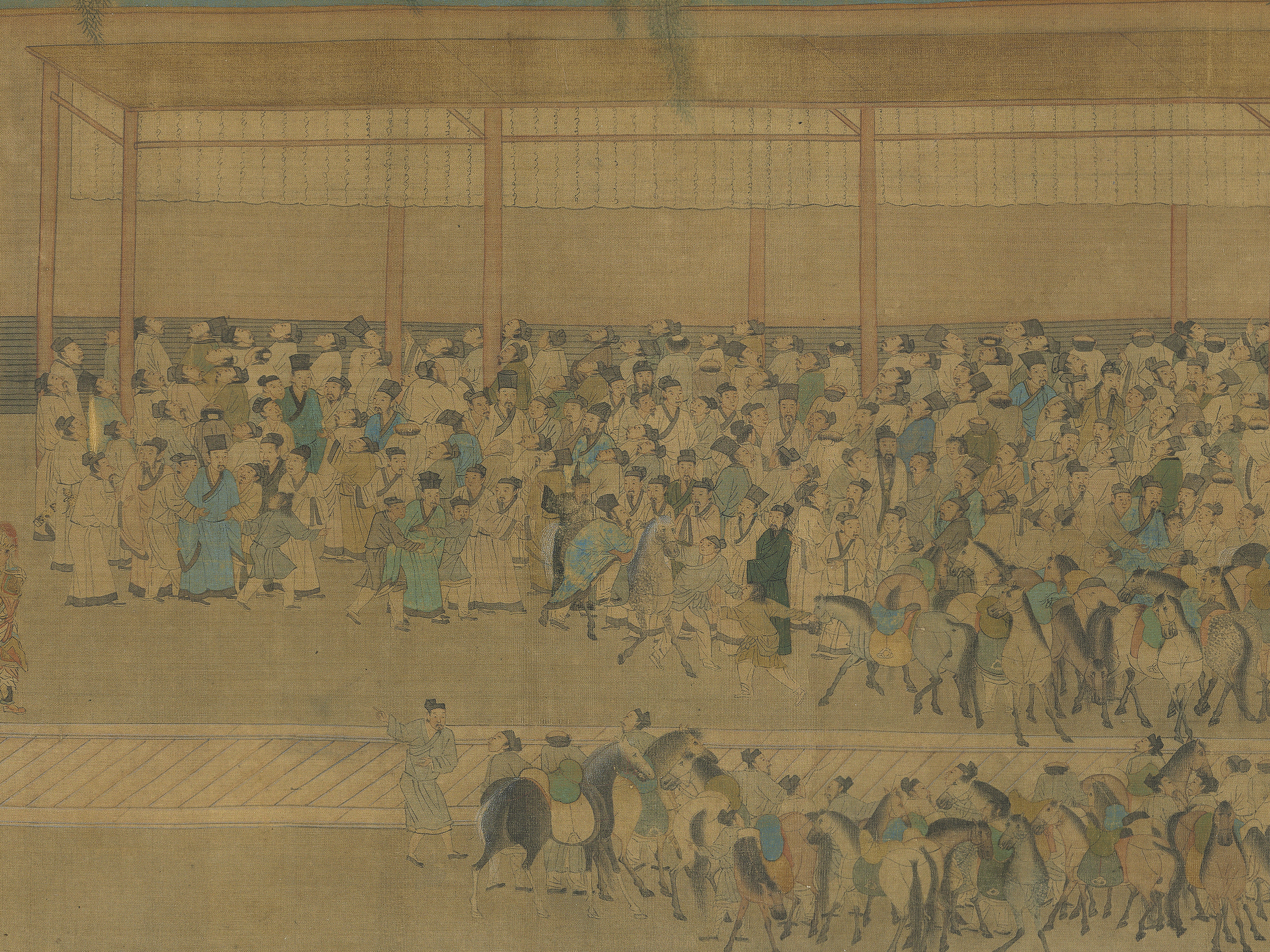
A Ming-era painting by Qiu Ying depicting candidates for civil service gathered around the wall where examination results had been posted

Students of Confucian studies were candidates for the imperial examinations, which qualified their graduates for appointment to the local, provincial, and central government bureaucracies. Two types of exams were given, mingjing (明經; 'illuminating the classics') and jinshi (進士; 'presented scholar'). The mingjing was based upon the Confucian classics and tested the student's knowledge of a wide variety of texts. The jinshi tested a student's literary abilities in writing essays in response to questions on governance and politics, as well as in composing poetry. Candidates were also judged on proper deportment, appearance, speech, and calligraphy, all subjective criteria that favoured the wealthy over those of more modest means who were unable to pay tutors of rhetoric and writing. Although a disproportionate number of civil officials came from aristocratic families, wealth and noble status were not prerequisites, and the exams were open to all male subjects whose fathers were not of the artisan or merchant classes. To promote widespread Confucian education, the Tang government established state-run schools and issued standard versions of the Five Classics with commentaries.

An open competition was designed to draw the best talent into government. But perhaps an even greater consideration for the Tang rulers was avoiding imperial dependence on powerful aristocratic families and warlords by recruiting a body of career officials with no family or local power base. The Tang law code ensured equal division of inherited property among legitimate heirs, encouraging social mobility by preventing powerful families from becoming landed nobility through primogeniture. Contrary to older accounts that portrayed the imperial examination as marginal in Tang times, recent quantitative research shows that by the late seventh century the jinshi degree had already become the primary route to high office, while aristocratic family pedigree had largely lost its predictive power for bureaucratic appointment. The Tang examination system thus played a decisive institutional role in displacing hereditary privilege and fostering a bureaucratic elite selected by merit. From Tang times until the end of the Qing dynasty in 1912, scholar-officials served as intermediaries between the people and the government, their authority deriving less from lineage than from examination success.

Although the system was later further expanded under the Song, the essential transformation from aristocratic to bureaucratic governance had already taken shape during the Tang dynasty.

=== Religion and politics ===
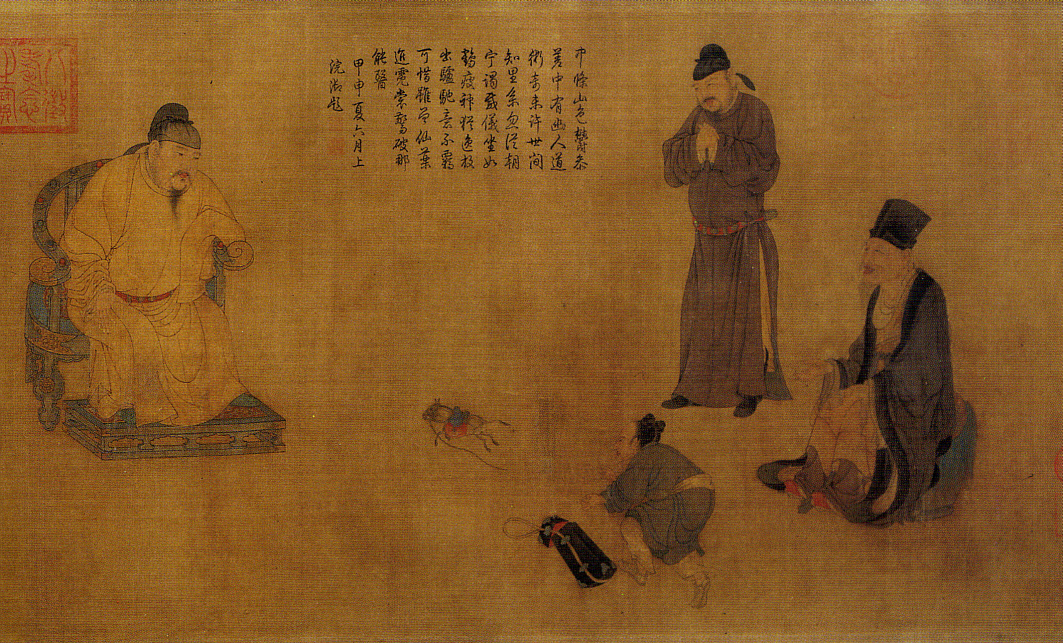
Emperor Xuanzong of Tang giving audience to Zhang Guo, by Ren Renfa (1254–1327)

From the outset, religion played a role in Tang politics. In his bid for power, Li Yuan had attracted a following by claiming descent from the Taoist sage Laozi (fl. 6th century BC). People bidding for office would request the prayers of Buddhist monks, with successful aspirants making donations in return. Before the persecution of Buddhism in the 9th century, Buddhism and Taoism were both accepted. Religion was central in the reign of Emperor Xuanzong (r. 712–756). The emperor invited Taoist and Buddhist monks and clerics to his court, exalted Laozi with grand titles, wrote commentaries on Taoist scriptures, and established a school to train candidates for Taoist examinations. In 726, he called upon the Indian monk Vajrabodhi (671–741) to perform tantric rites to avert a drought. In 742, he personally held the incense burner while patriarch of the Shingon school Amoghavajra (705–774) recited "mystical incantations to secure the victory of Tang forces".

Emperor Xuanzong closely regulated religious finances. Near the beginning of his reign in 713, he liquidated the Inexhaustible Treasury of a prominent Buddhist monastery in Chang'an, which had collected vast riches as multitudes of anonymous repentants left money, silk, and treasure at its doors. Although the monastery used its funds generously, the emperor condemned it for fraudulent banking practices, and distributed its wealth to other Buddhist and Taoist monasteries, and to repair local statues, halls, and bridges. In 714, he forbade Chang'an shops from selling copied Buddhist sutras, giving a monopoly of this trade to the Buddhist clergy.

=== Taxes and the census ===
The Tang government attempted to conduct an accurate census of the empire's population, primarily to support effective taxation and military conscription. The early Tang government established modest grain and cloth taxes per household, encouraging households to register and provide the government with accurate demographic information. In the official census of 609, the population was tallied at 9 million households, about 50 million people, and this number did not increase in the census of 742. Patricia Ebrey writes that, notwithstanding census undercounting, China's population had not grown significantly since the earlier Han dynasty, which recorded 58 million people in 2 AD. Adshead disagrees, estimating about 75 million people by 750.

In the Tang census of 754, there were 1,859 cities, 321 prefectures, and 1,538 counties throughout the empire. Although there were many large and prominent cities, the rural and agrarian areas comprised 80–90% of the population. There was also a dramatic migration from northern to southern China, as the North held 75% of the overall population at the dynasty's inception, which by its end was reduced to 50%. The Chinese population would not dramatically increase until the Song dynasty, when it doubled to 100 million because of extensive rice cultivation in central and southern China, coupled with higher yields of grain sold in a growing market.

== Military and foreign policy ==
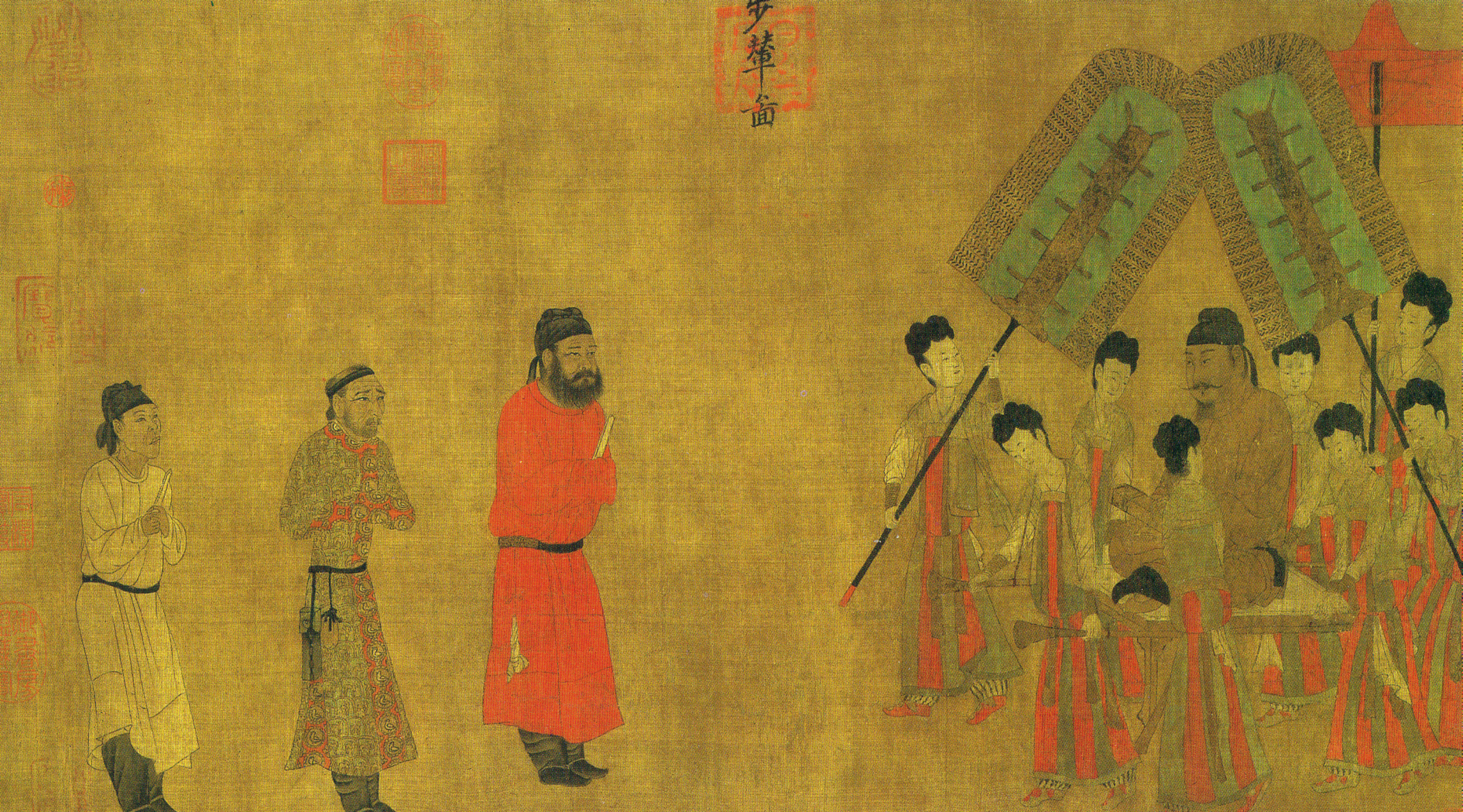
Emperor Taizong (r. 626–649) receives Gar Tongtsen Yülsung, ambassador of the Tibetan Empire, at his court – later copy of an original painted in 641 by Yan Liben (600–673)

=== Protectorates and tributaries ===
The 7th and first half of the 8th century are generally considered to be the era in which the Tang reached the zenith of its power. In this period, Tang control extended further west than any previous dynasty, stretching from north Vietnam in the south, to a point north of Kashmir bordering Persia in the west, to northern Korea in the north-east.

Some of the kingdoms paying tribute to the Tang dynasty included Kashmir, Nepal, Khotan, Kucha, Kashgar, Silla, Champa, and kingdoms located in Amu Darya and Syr Darya valley. Turkic nomads addressed the Tang emperor as Tian Kehan. After the widespread Göktürk revolt of Shabolüe Khan (d. 658) was put down at Issyk Kul in 657 by Su Dingfang (591–667), Emperor Gaozong established several protectorates governed by a Protectorate General or Grand Protectorate General, which extended the Chinese sphere of influence as far as Herat in Western Afghanistan. Protectorate Generals were given a great deal of autonomy to handle local crises without waiting for central admission. After Xuanzong's reign, jiedushi were given enormous power, including the ability to maintain their own armies, collect taxes, and pass their titles on hereditarily. This is commonly recognised as the beginning of the fall of Tang's central government.

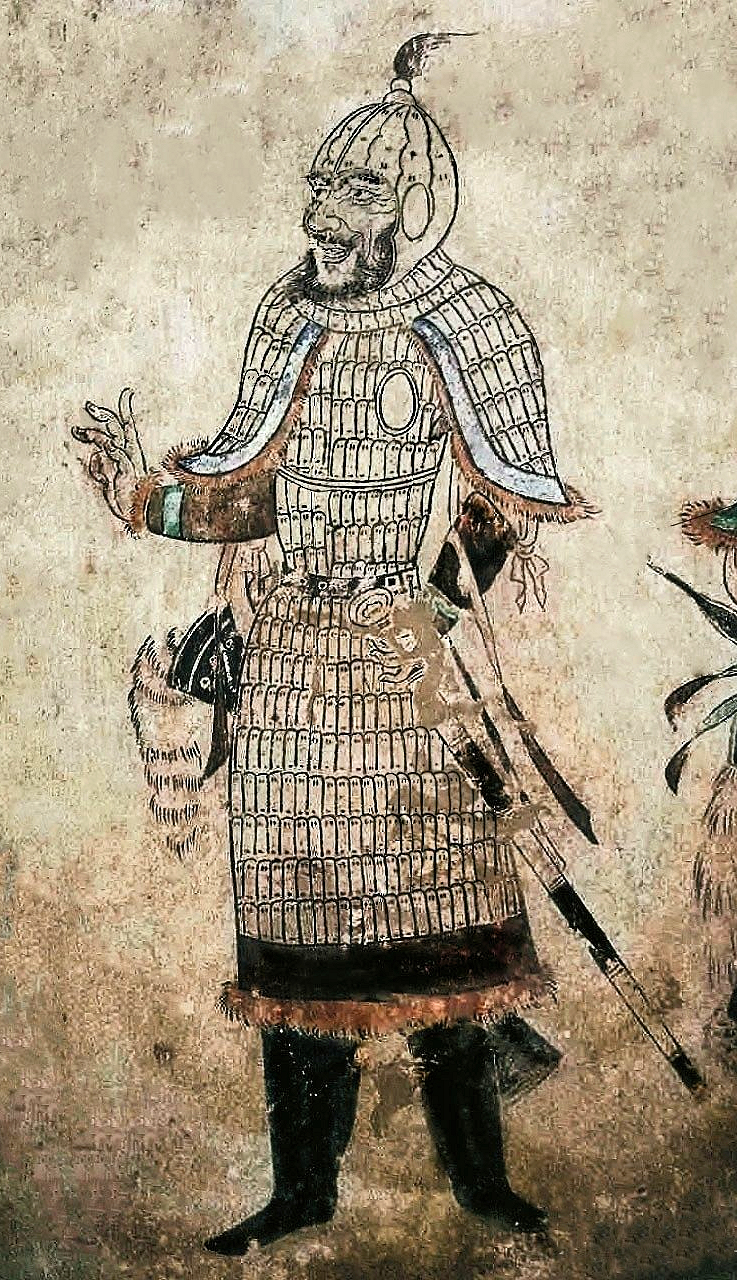
Chinese officer of the Guard of Honour in the Tomb of Princess Chang-le (长乐公主墓) – Zhao Mausoleum, Shaanxi

=== Soldiers and conscription ===
By 737, Emperor Xuanzong discarded the policy of conscripting soldiers that were replaced every three years, replacing them with long-service soldiers who were more battle-hardened and efficient. It was more economically feasible as well, since training new recruits and sending them out to the frontier every three years drained the treasury. By the late 7th century, the fubing troops began abandoning military service and the homes provided to them in the equal-field system. The supposed standard of 100 mu of land allotted to each family was in fact decreasing in size in places where population expanded and the wealthy bought up most of the land. Hard-pressed peasants and vagrants were then induced into military service with benefits of exemption from both taxation and corvée labour service, as well as provisions for farmland and dwellings for dependents who accompanied soldiers on the frontier. By 742, the total number of enlisted troops in the Tang armies had risen to about 500,000 men.

=== Eastern regions ===
In East Asia, Tang military campaigns were less successful elsewhere than in previous imperial Chinese dynasties. Like the emperors of the Sui dynasty before him, Taizong established a military campaign in 644 against the Korean kingdom of Goguryeo in the Goguryeo–Tang War; however, this led to its withdrawal in the first campaign because they failed to overcome the successful defence led by General Yŏn Kaesomun. The Tang entered into the Silla–Tang alliance, the Chinese fought against Baekje and their Yamato Japanese allies in the Battle of Baekgang in August 663, a decisive Tang–Silla victory. The Tang dynasty navy had several different ship types at its disposal to engage in naval warfare, these ships described by Li Quan in his Taipai Yinjing (Canon of the White and Gloomy Planet of War) of 759. The Battle of Baekgang was actually a restoration movement by remnant forces of Baekje, since their kingdom was toppled in 660 by a Tang–Silla invasion, led by Chinese general Su Dingfang and Korean general Kim Yushin (595–673). In another joint invasion with Silla, the Tang army severely weakened the Goguryeo Kingdom in the north by taking out its outer forts in 645. With joint attacks by Silla and Tang armies under commander Li Shiji (594–669), the Kingdom of Goguryeo was destroyed by 668.

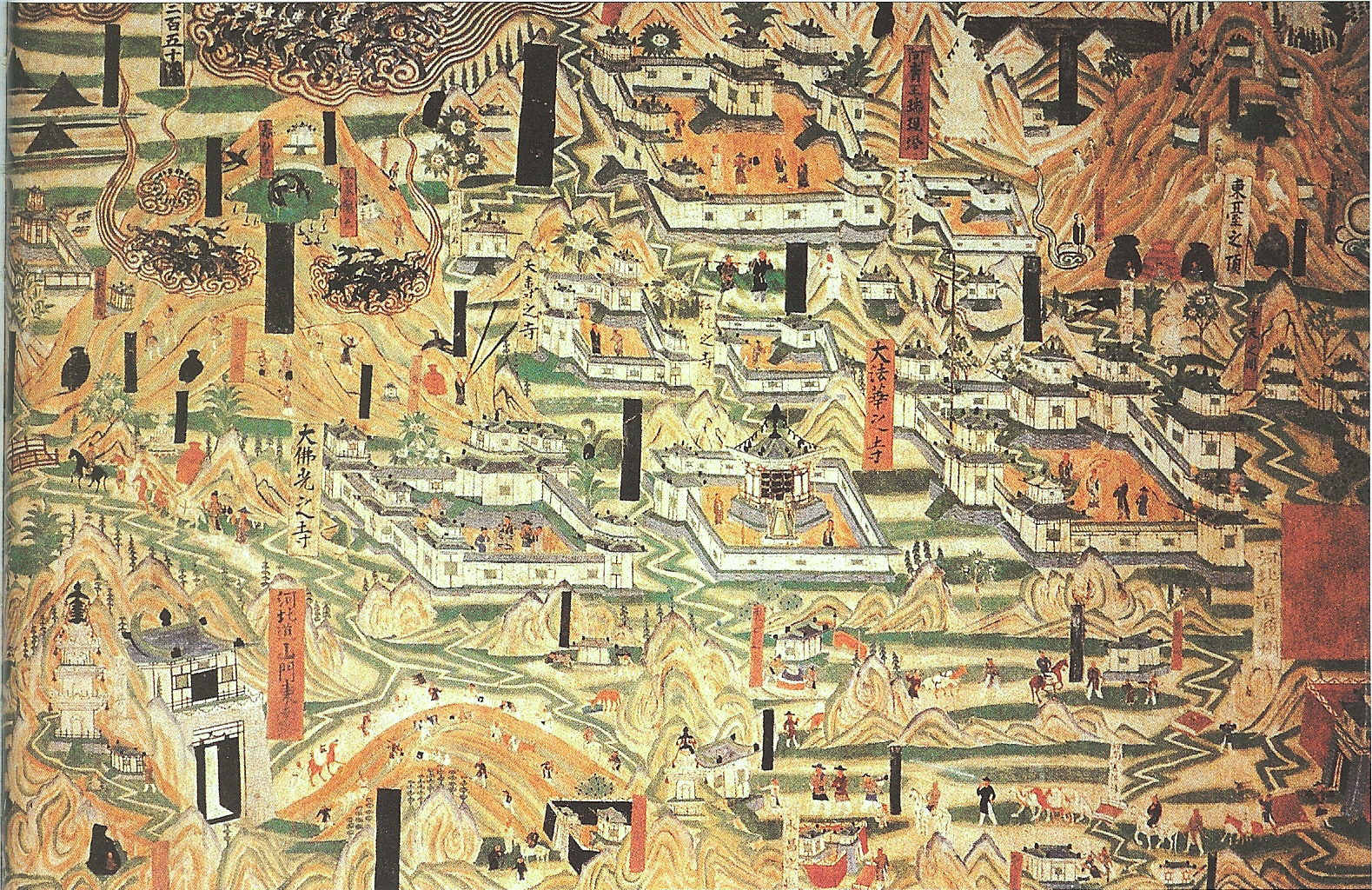
A 10th-century mural painting in the Mogao Caves at Dunhuang showing monastic architecture from Mount Wutai, Tang dynasty; Japanese architecture of this period was influenced by Tang Chinese architecture

Although they were formerly enemies, the Tang accepted officials and generals of Goguryeo into their administration and military, such as the brothers Yŏn Namsaeng (634–679) and Yŏn Namsan (639–701). From 668 to 676, the Tang Empire controlled northern Korea. However, Silla broke the alliance in 671, and began the Silla–Tang War to expel the Tang forces. At the same time the Tang faced threats on its western border when a large Chinese army was defeated by the Tibetans on the Dafei River in 670. By 676, the Tang army was expelled out of Korea by a unified Silla. Following a revolt of the Eastern Turks in 679, the Tang abandoned its Korean campaigns.

Although the Tang had fought the Japanese, they still held cordial relations with Japan. There were numerous Imperial embassies to China from Japan, diplomatic missions that were not halted until 894 by Emperor Uda (r. 887–897), upon persuasion by Sugawara no Michizane (845–903). The Japanese Emperor Tenmu (r. 672–686) even established his conscripted army on that of the Chinese model, based his state ceremonies on the Chinese model, and constructed his palace at Fujiwara on the Chinese model of architecture.

Many Chinese Buddhist monks came to Japan to help further the spread of Buddhism as well. Two 7th-century monks, Zhi Yu and Zhi You, visited the court of Emperor Tenji (r. 661–672), whereupon they presented a gift of a south-pointing chariot that they had crafted. This vehicle employing a differential gear was reproduced in several models for Tenji in 666, as recorded in the Nihon Shoki (720). Japanese monks also visited China; such was the case with Ennin (794–864), who wrote of his travel experiences including travels along the Grand Canal. The Japanese monk Enchin (814–891) stayed in China from 839 to 847, and again from 853 to 858, landing near Fuzhou, Fujian and setting sail for Japan from Taizhou, Zhejiang during his second trip to China.

=== Western and Northern regions ===
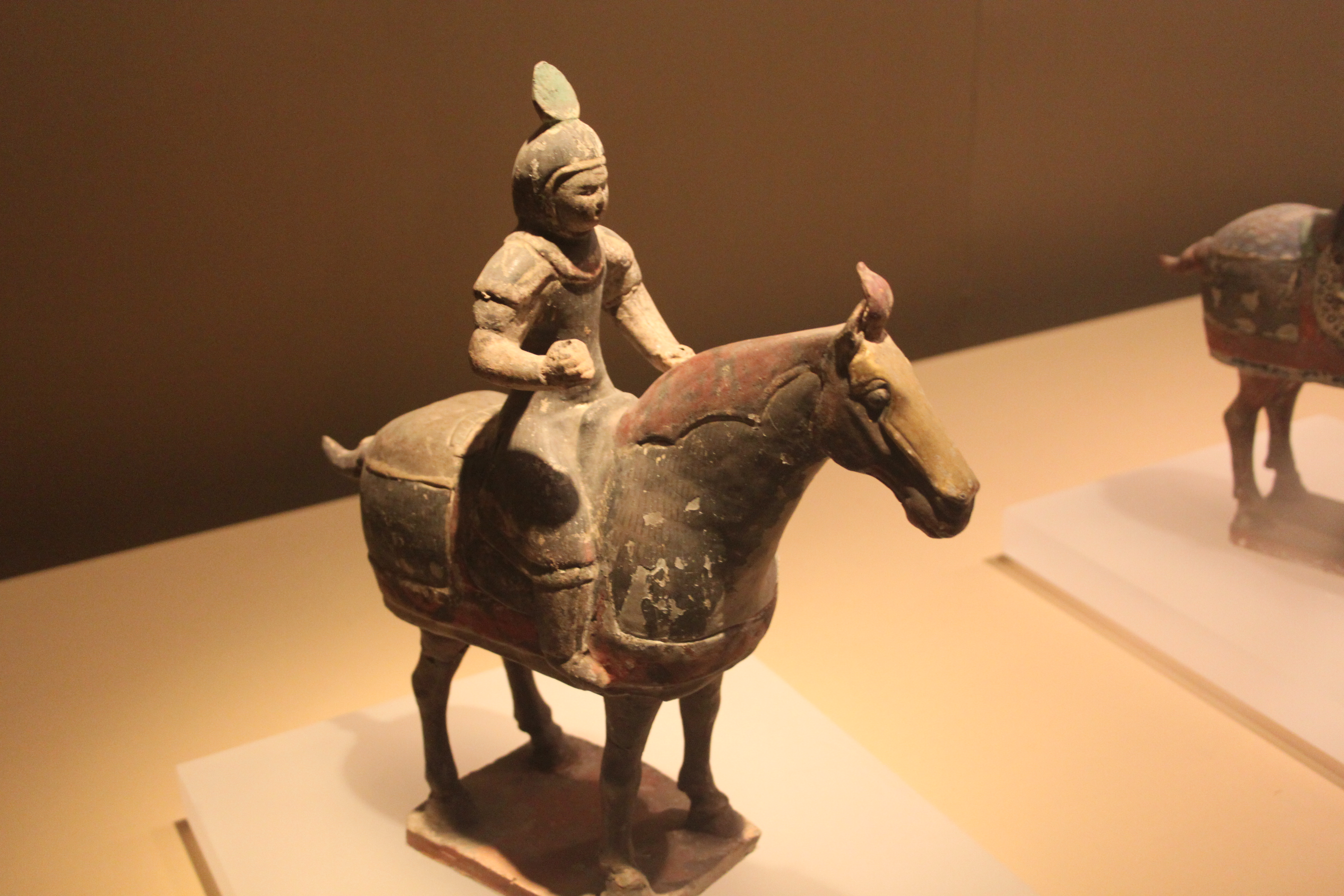
Tomb figure of mounted warrior similar to the one unearthed from the tomb of crown prince Li Chongrun

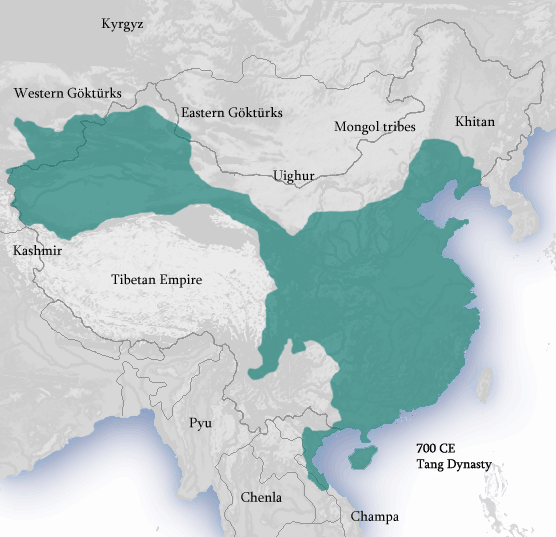
Tang Dynasty circa 700 CE

The Sui and Tang carried out successful military campaigns against the steppe nomads. Chinese foreign policy to the north and west now had to deal with Turkic nomads, who were becoming the most dominant ethnic group in Central Asia. To handle and avoid any threats posed by the Turks, the Sui government repaired fortifications and received their trade and tribute missions. They sent four royal princesses to form heqin marriage alliances with Turkic clan leaders, in 597, 599, 614, and 617. The Sui stirred trouble and conflict among ethnic groups against the Turks. As early as the Sui dynasty, the Turks had become a major militarised force employed by the Chinese. When the Khitans began raiding northeast China in 605, a Chinese general led 20,000 Turks against them, distributing Khitan livestock and women to the Turks as a reward. On two occasions between 635 and 636, Tang royal princesses were married to Turk mercenaries or generals in Chinese service. Throughout the Tang dynasty until the end of 755, there were approximately ten Turkic generals serving under the Tang. While most of the Tang army was made of fubing Chinese conscripts, the majority of the troops led by Turkic generals were of non-Chinese origin, campaigning largely in the western frontier where the presence of fubing troops was low. Some "Turkic" troops were tribalised Han Chinese, a desinicised people.

Civil war in China was almost totally diminished by 626, along with the 628 defeat of the Ordos warlord Liang Shidu; after these internal conflicts, the Tang began an offensive against the Turks. In 630, Tang armies captured areas of the Ordos Desert, modern-day Inner Mongolia province, and southern Mongolia from the Turks. After this military victory, On June 11, 631, Emperor Taizong also sent envoys to the Xueyantuo bearing gold and silk in order to persuade the release of enslaved Chinese prisoners who were captured during the transition from Sui to Tang from the northern frontier; this embassy succeeded in freeing 80,000 Chinese men and women who were then returned to China.

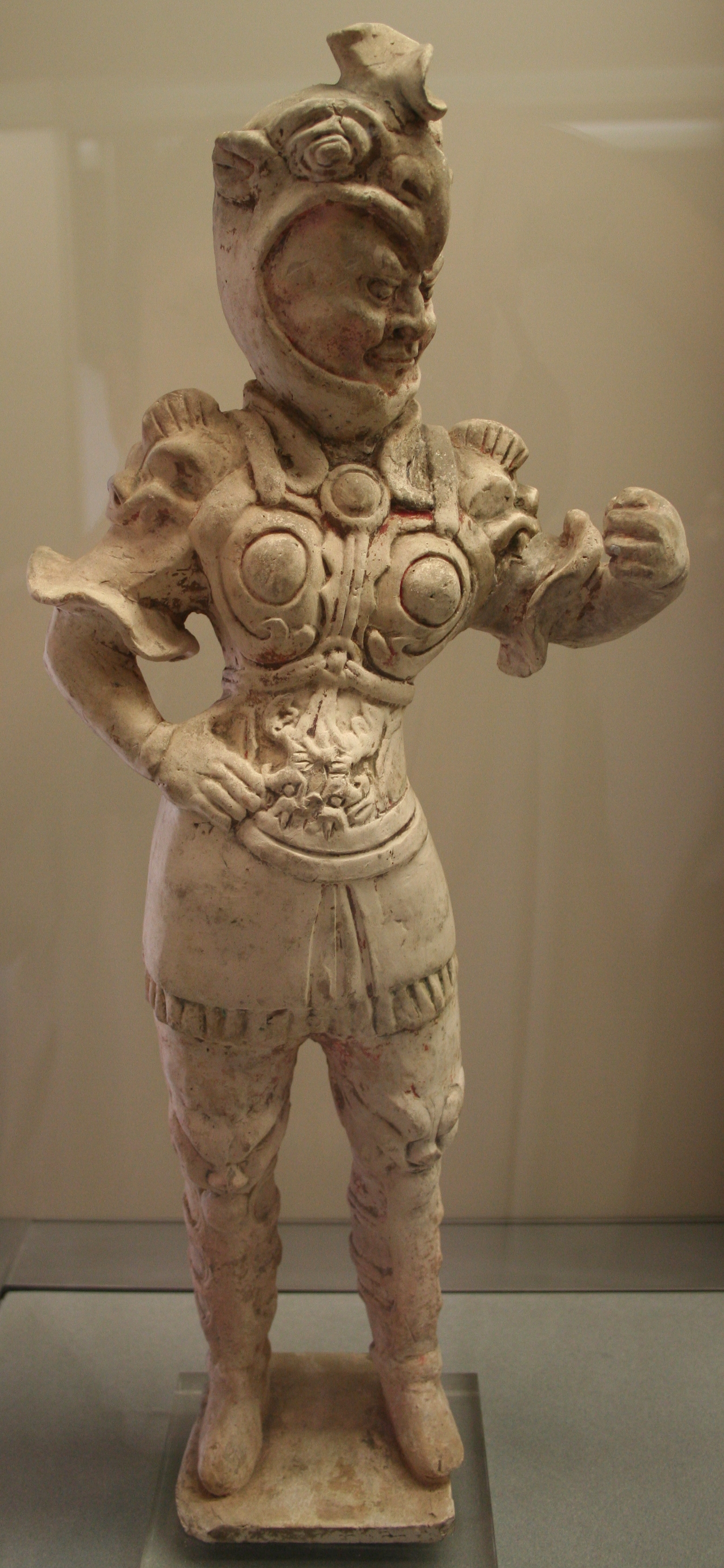
Tang Tomb guardian, early 8th century

While the Turks were settled in the Ordos region (former territory of the Xiongnu), the Tang government took on the military policy of dominating the central steppe. As during the earlier Han dynasty, the Tang and their Turkic allies conquered and subdued Central Asia during the 640s and 650s. During Emperor Taizong's reign alone, large campaigns were launched against not only the Göktürks, but also separate campaigns against the Tuyuhun, the oasis states, and the Xueyantuo. Under Emperor Gaozong, a campaign led by the general Su Dingfang was launched against the Western Turks ruled by Ashina Helu.

The Tang Empire competed with the Tibetan Empire for control of areas in Inner and Central Asia, which was at times settled with marriage alliances such as the marrying of Princess Wencheng (d. 680) to Songtsän Gampo (d. 649). A Tibetan tradition mentions that Chinese troops captured Lhasa after Songtsän Gampo's death, but no such invasion is mentioned in either Chinese annals or the Tibetan manuscripts of Dunhuang.

There was a string of conflicts with Tibet over territories in the Tarim Basin between 670 and 692; in 763, the Tibetans captured Chang'an for fifteen days during the An Lushan rebellion. In fact, it was during this rebellion that the Tang withdrew its western garrisons stationed in what is now Gansu and Qinghai, which the Tibetans then occupied along with the territory of what is now Xinjiang. Hostilities between the Tang and Tibet continued until they signed the Changqing Treaty in 821. The terms of this treaty, including the fixed borders between the two countries, are recorded in a bilingual inscription on a stone pillar outside the Jokhang temple in Lhasa.

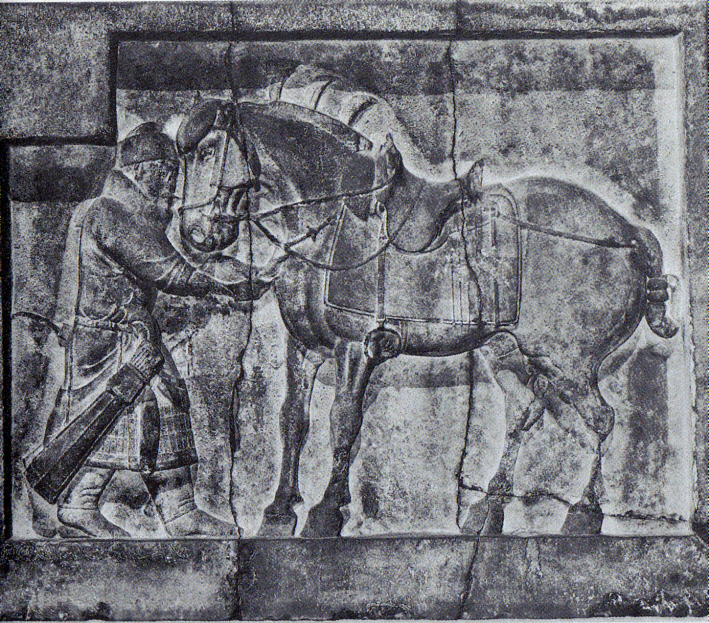
A bas relief of a soldier and the emperor's horse, Autumn Dew, with elaborate saddle and stirrups, designed by Yan Liben, from the tomb of Emperor Taizong c. 650

During the Islamic conquest of Persia (633–656), the son of the last ruler of the Sasanian Empire, Prince Peroz and his court moved to Tang China. According to the Old Book of Tang, Peroz was made the head of a Governorate of Persia in present-day Zaranj, Afghanistan. During this conquest of Persia, the Rashidun Caliph Uthman (r. 644–656) sent an embassy to the Tang court at Chang'an. Arab sources claim Umayyad commander Qutayba ibn Muslim briefly took Kashgar from China and withdrew after an agreement, but modern historians entirely dismiss this claim. The Arab Umayyad Caliphate in 715 deposed Ikhshid, the king the Fergana Valley, and installed a new king Alutar on the throne. The deposed king fled to Kucha (seat of Anxi Protectorate), and sought Chinese intervention. The Chinese sent 10,000 troops under Zhang Xiaosong to Ferghana. He defeated Alutar and the Arab occupation force at Namangan and reinstalled Ikhshid on the throne. The Tang defeated the Arab Umayyad invaders at the Battle of Aksu (717). The Arab Umayyad commander Al-Yashkuri and his army fled to Tashkent after they were defeated. The Turgesh then crushed the Arab Umayyads and drove them out. By the 740s, the Arabs under the Abbasid Caliphate in Khorasan had reestablished a presence in the Ferghana basin and in Sogdiana. During the decline of the Umayyad Caliphate in 750, combined with Emperor Xuanzong's expansion policy, enabled Tang to reassert its influence in Transoxania and become the predominant power in Chinese Turkestan. However, this resurgence ended suddenly at the Battle of Talas in 751. The Tang army led by Gao Xianzhi was defeated by the Abbasid army under Ziyad ibn Salih near present-day Tashkent. Sources differ on the force numbers and casualties with army sizes ranging from 10,000 to 100,000 for the Chinese side and 30,000 to 200,000 for the Abbasid side, although the larger numbers for both are likely exaggerated. Chinese sources state that the Tang army suffered 20,000 to 30,000 casualties while Arab sources state that 50,000 Tang soldiers were killed and 20,000 were taken captive. This defeat marked the end of Tang influence in Transoxiana and halted Tang westward expansion. The Abbasids then consolidated their rule in Transoxania. with also the spread of Chinese papermaking into regions west of China as captured Chinese soldiers shared the technique of papermaking to the Arabs. These techniques ultimately reached Europe by the 12th century through Arab-controlled Spain. Although they had fought at Talas, on June 11, 758, an Abbasid embassy arrived at Chang'an simultaneously with the Uyghurs bearing gifts for the Tang emperor. In 788–789 the Chinese concluded a military alliance with the Uyghur Turks who twice defeated the Tibetans, in 789 near the town of Gaochang in Dzungaria, and in 791 near Ningxia on the Yellow River.

Illustration of the 643 Byzantine embassy to Tang Taizong

Joseph Needham writes that a tributary embassy came to the court of Emperor Taizong in 643 from the Patriarch of Antioch. However, Friedrich Hirth and other sinologists such as S. A. M. Adshead have identified fulin (拂菻) in the Old and New Book of Tang as the Byzantine Empire, which those histories directly associated with Daqin (i.e. the Roman Empire). The embassy sent in 643 by Boduoli (波多力) was identified as Byzantine ruler Constans II Pogonatos, and further embassies were recorded as being sent into the 8th century. Adshead offers a different transliteration stemming from "patriarch" or "patrician", possibly a reference to one of the acting regents for the young Byzantine monarch. The Old and New Book of Tang also provide a description of the Byzantine capital Constantinople, including how it was besieged by the Da Shi (大食, i.e. the Umayyad Caliphate) forces of Mu'awiya I, who forced them to pay tribute to the Arabs.

== Economy ==
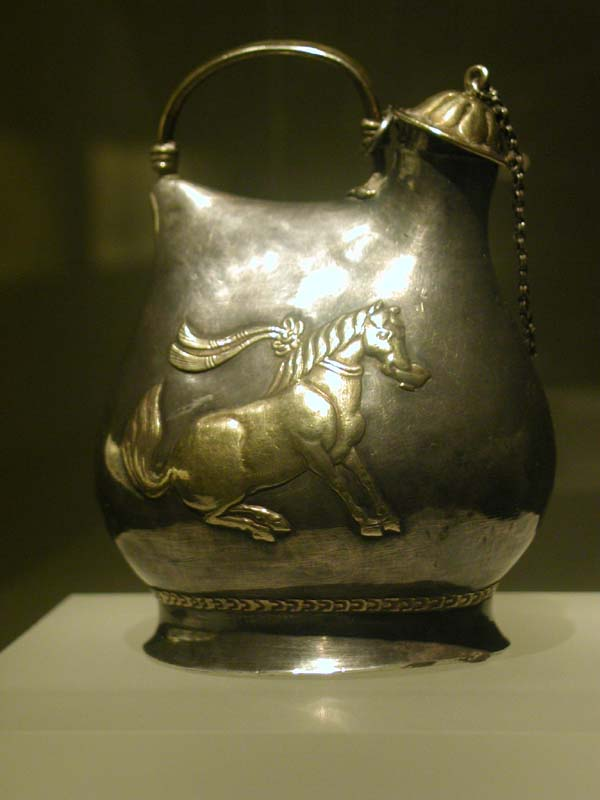
A Tang gilt-silver jar, shaped in the style of a northern nomad's leather bag decorated with a horse dancing with a cup of wine in its mouth, as the horses of Emperor Xuanzong were trained to do.

Through use of the land trade along the Silk Road and maritime trade by sail at sea, the Tang were able to acquire and gain many new technologies, cultural practices, rare luxury, and contemporary items. From Europe, the Middle East, Central and South Asia, the Tang dynasty were able to acquire new ideas in fashion, new types of ceramics, and improved silver-smithing techniques. The Tang also gradually adopted the foreign concept of stools and chairs as seating, whereas the Chinese beforehand always sat on mats placed on the floor. People of the Middle East coveted and purchased Chinese goods in bulk, including silks, porcelain, and lacquerwares. Songs, dances, and musical instruments from foreign regions became popular in China during the Tang dynasty. These musical instruments included oboes, flutes, and small lacquered drums from Kucha in the Tarim Basin, and percussion instruments from India such as cymbals. At the court there were nine musical ensembles (expanded from seven in the Sui dynasty) that played eclectic Asian music.

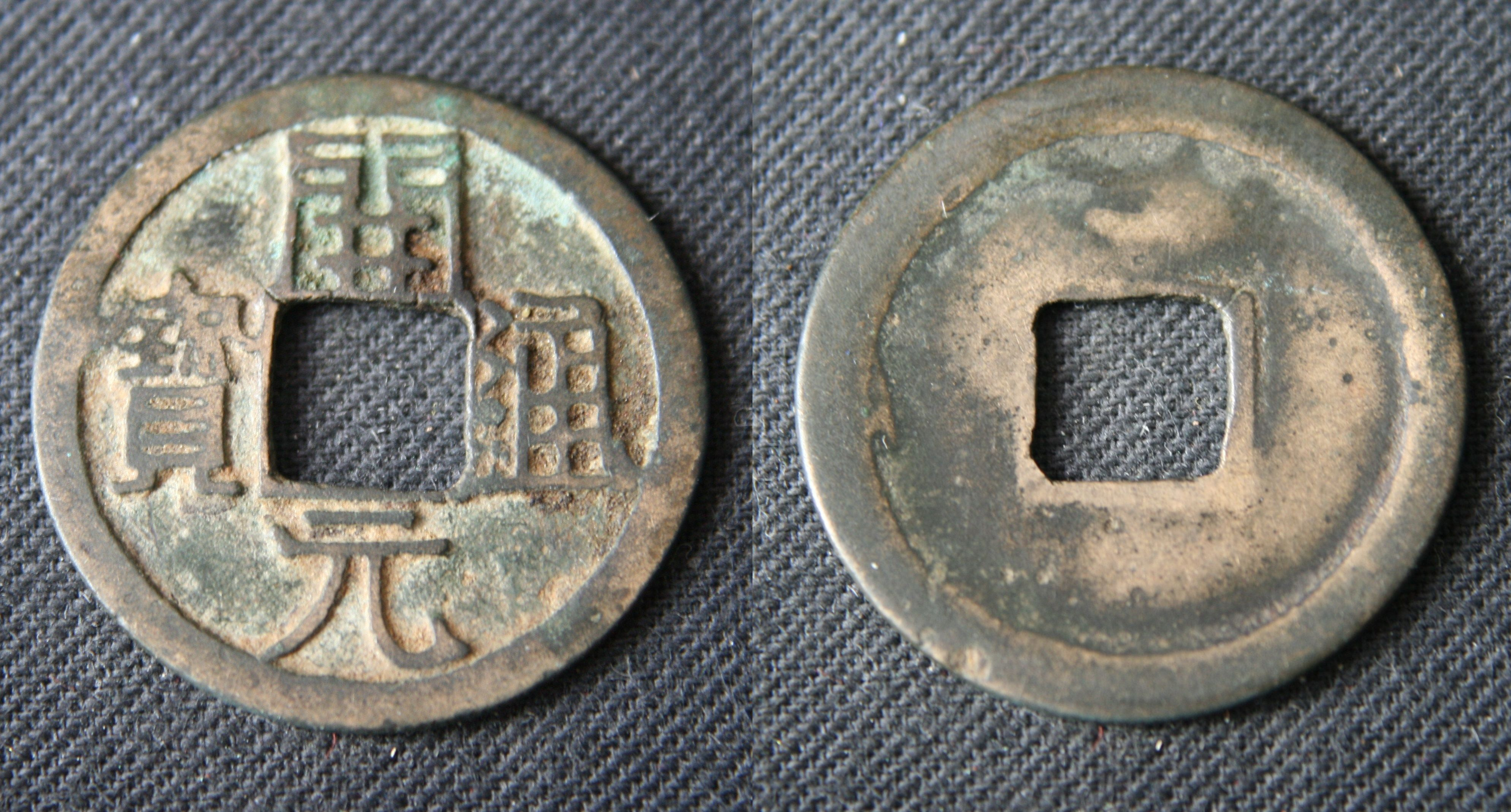
Tang Kaiyuan Tongbao coin, first minted in 621 in Chang'an, a model for the Japanese 8th-century Wadōkaichin

There was great interaction with India, a hub for Buddhist knowledge, with famous travellers such as Xuanzang (d. 664) visiting the South Asian state. After a 17-year trip, Xuanzang managed to bring back valuable Sanskrit texts to be translated into Chinese. There was also a Turkic–Chinese dictionary available for serious scholars and students, while Turkic folk songs gave inspiration to some Chinese poetry. In the interior of China, trade was facilitated by the Grand Canal and the Tang government's rationalisation of the greater canal system that reduced costs of transporting grain and other commodities. The state also managed roughly 32,100 km (19,900 mi) of postal service routes by horse or boat.

=== Silk Road ===
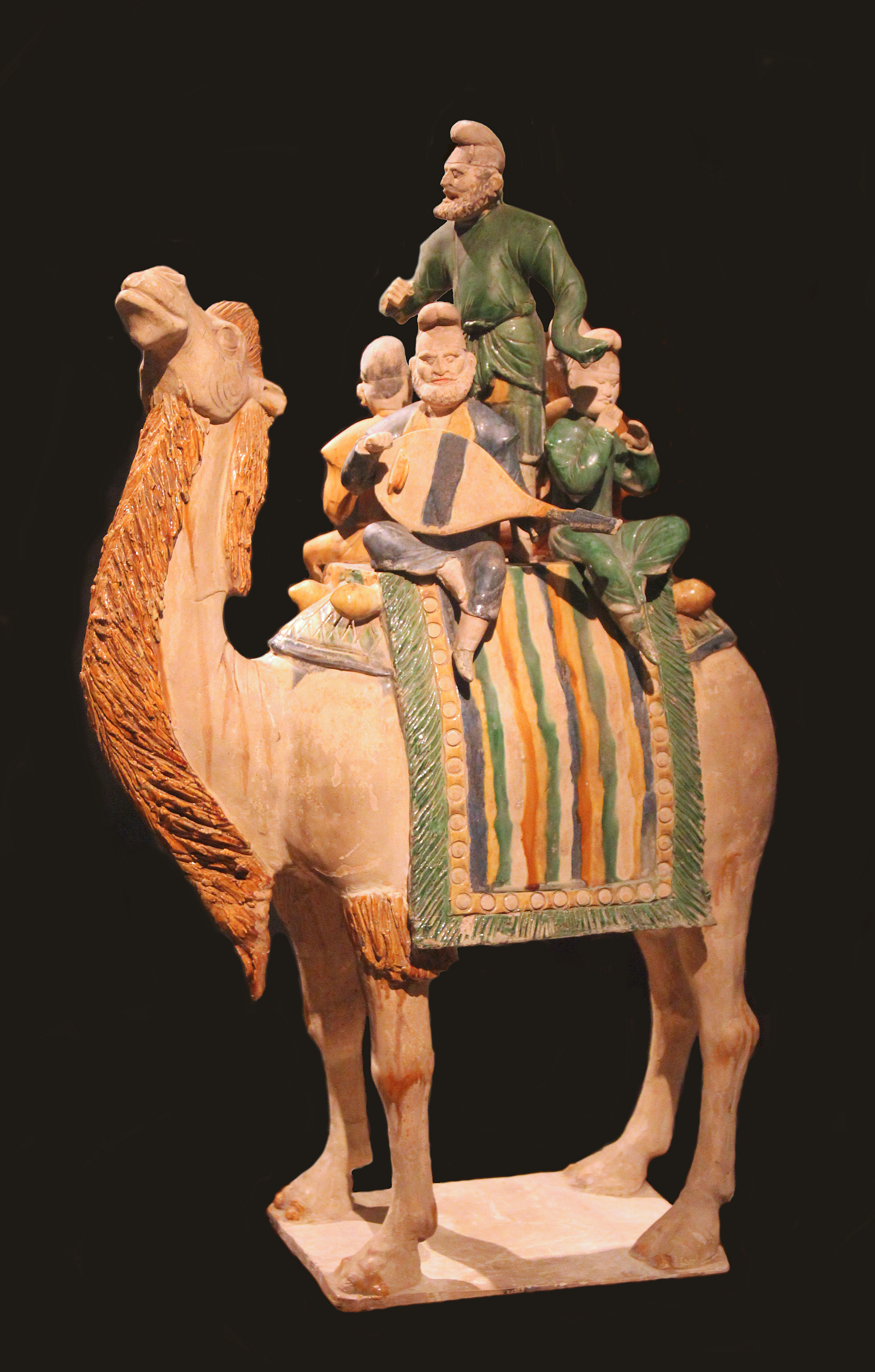
A 723 Tang sancai statuette of Sogdian musicians riding on a Bactrian camel

Although the Silk Road from China to Europe and the Western world was initially formulated during the reign of Emperor Wu (141–87 BC) during the Han, it was reopened by the Tang in 639, when Hou Junji (d. 643) conquered the West, and remained open for almost four decades. It was closed after the Tibetans captured it in 678, but in 699, the Silk Road reopened when the Tang reconquered the Four Garrisons of Anxi originally installed in 640, once again connecting China directly to the West for land-based trade.

The Tang captured the vital route through the Gilgit valley from Tibet in 722, lost it to the Tibetans in 737, and regained it under the command of the Goguryeo-Korean General Gao Xianzhi. When the An Lushan rebellion ended in 763, the Tang Empire withdrew its troops from its western lands, allowing the Tibetan Empire to largely cut off China's direct access to the Silk Road. An internal rebellion in 848 ousted the Tibetan rulers, and the Tang regained the northwestern prefectures from Tibet in 851. These lands contained crucial grazing areas and pastures for raising horses that the Tang dynasty desperately needed.

Despite the many expatriate European travellers coming into China to live and trade, many travellers, mainly religious monks and missionaries, recorded China's stringent immigrant laws. As the monk Xuanzang and many other monk travellers attested to, there were many government checkpoints along the Silk Road that examined travel permits into the Tang Empire. Furthermore, banditry was a problem along the checkpoints and oasis towns, as Xuanzang also recorded that his group of travellers were assaulted by bandits on multiple occasions.

The Silk Road also affected the art from the period. Horses became a significant symbol of prosperity and power as well as an instrument of military and diplomatic policy. Horses were also revered as a relative of the dragon.

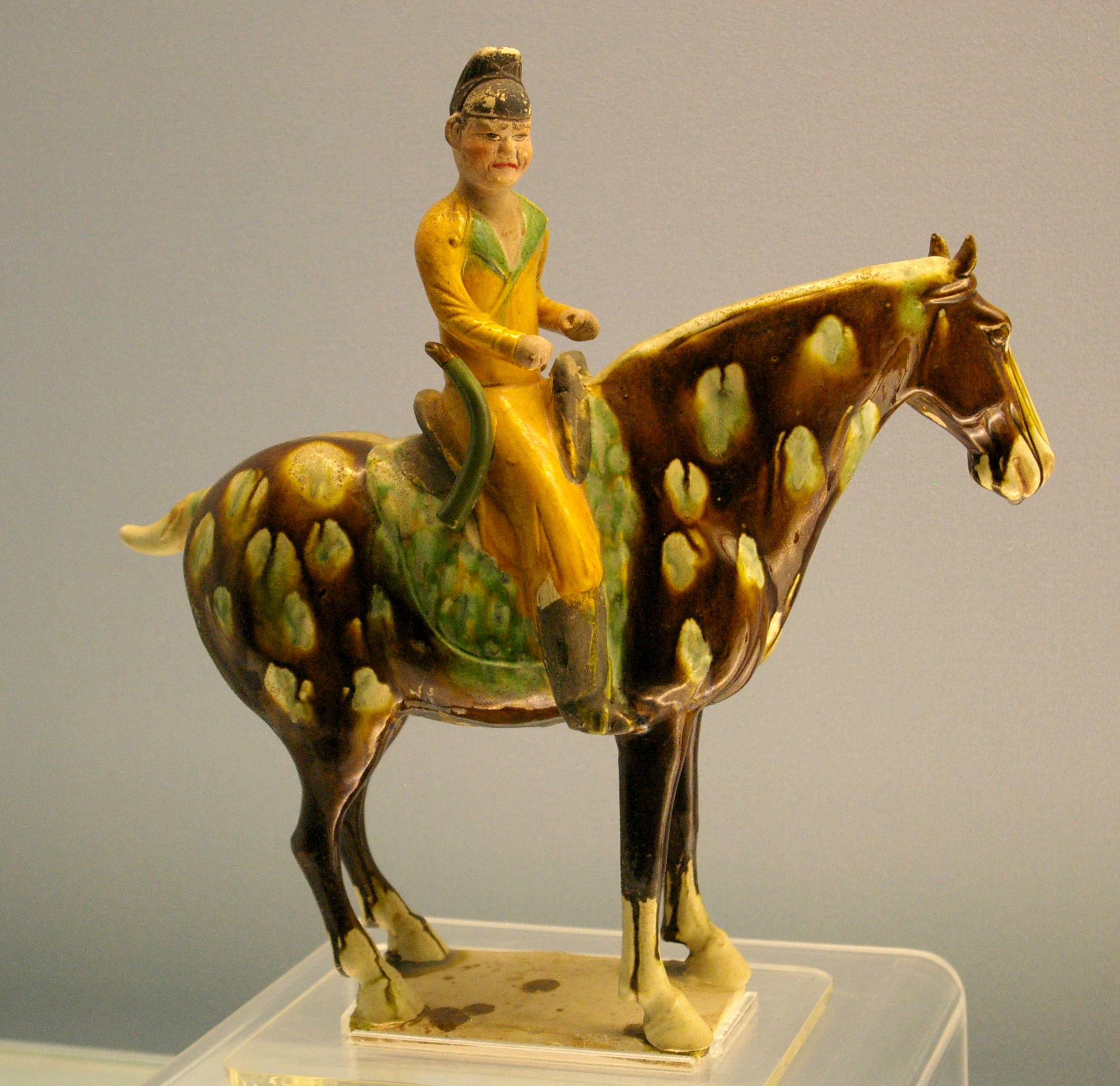
A Tang sancai glazed tomb figure an equestrian figure on a horse

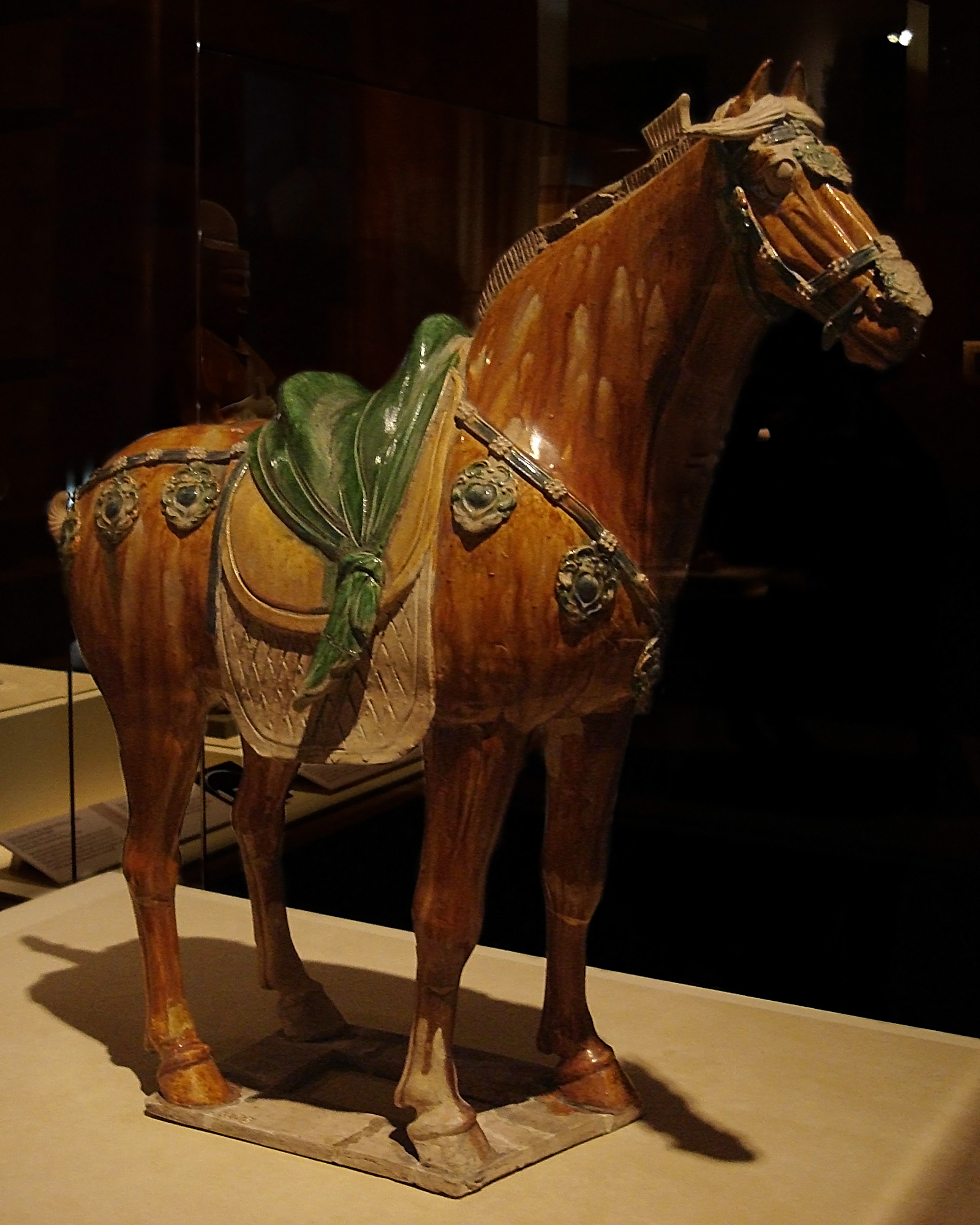
A sancai glazed horse tomb figure excavated from Xi'an

=== Seaports and maritime trade ===
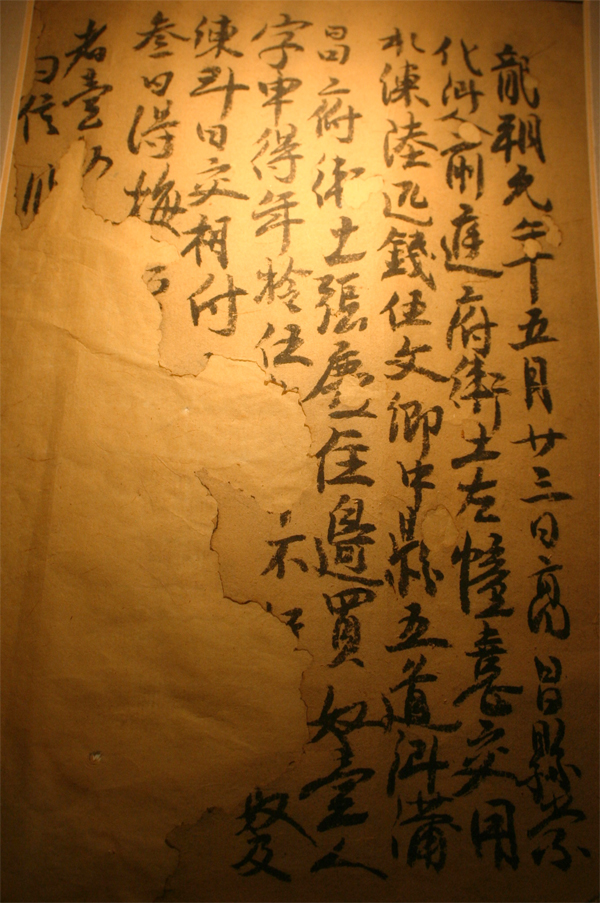
A contract from the Tang dynasty found in the Astana Cemetery in Turfan that records the purchase of a 15-year-old slave for six bolts of plain silk and five Chinese coins

Chinese envoys had been sailing through the Indian Ocean to states of India as early as the 2nd century BC, yet it was during the Tang dynasty that a strong Chinese maritime presence could be found in the Persian Gulf and Red Sea, into Persia, Mesopotamia (sailing up the Euphrates River in modern-day Iraq), Arabia, Egypt, Aksum (Ethiopia), and Somalia in the Horn of Africa.

During the Tang dynasty, thousands of foreign expatriate merchants came and lived in numerous Chinese cities to do business with China, including Persians, Arabs, Hindu Indians, Malays, Bengalis, Sinhalese, Khmers, Chams, Jews and Nestorian Christians of the Near East. In 748, the Buddhist monk Jian Zhen described Guangzhou as a bustling mercantile business center where many large and impressive foreign ships came to dock. He wrote that "many large ships came from Borneo, Persia, Qunglun (Java) ... with ... spices, pearls, and jade piled up mountain high", as written in the Yue Jue Shu (Lost Records of the State of Yue). Relations with the Arabs were often strained: When the imperial government was attempting to quell the An Lushan rebellion, Arab and Persian pirates burned and looted Canton on October 30, 758. The Tang government reacted by shutting the port of Canton down for roughly five decades; thus, foreign vessels docked at Hanoi instead. However, when the port reopened, it continued to thrive. In 851, the Arab merchant Sulaiman al-Tajir observed the manufacturing of porcelain in Guangzhou and admired its transparent quality. He also provided a description of Guangzhou's landmarks, granaries, local government administration, some of its written records, treatment of travellers, along with the use of ceramics, rice, wine, and tea. Their presence ended in the vengeful Guangzhou massacre by the rebel Huang Chao in 878, who purportedly slaughtered thousands regardless of ethnicity. Huang's rebellion was eventually suppressed in 884.

Vessels from other East Asian states such as Silla, Bohai and the Hizen Province of Japan were all involved in the Yellow Sea trade, which Silla of Korea dominated. After Silla and Japan reopened renewed hostilities in the late 7th century, most Japanese maritime merchants chose to set sail from Nagasaki towards the mouth of the Huai River, the Yangtze River, and even as far south as the Hangzhou Bay in order to avoid Korean ships in the Yellow Sea. In order to sail back to Japan in 838, the Japanese embassy to China procured nine ships and sixty Korean sailors from the Korean wards of Chuzhou and Lianshui cities along the Huai River. It is also known that Chinese trade ships travelling to Japan set sail from the various ports along the coasts of Zhejiang and Fujian provinces.

The Chinese engaged in large-scale production for overseas export by at least the time of the Tang. This was proven by the discovery of the Belitung shipwreck, a silt-preserved shipwrecked Arabian dhow in the Gaspar Strait near Belitung, which had 63,000 pieces of Tang ceramics, silver, and gold (including a Changsha bowl inscribed with a date corresponding to 826, roughly confirmed by radiocarbon dating of star anise at the wreck). Beginning in 785, the Chinese began to call regularly at Sufala on the East African coast in order to cut out Arab middlemen, with various contemporary Chinese sources giving detailed descriptions of trade in Africa. The official and geographer Jia Dan (730–805) wrote of two common sea trade routes in his day: one from the coast of the Bohai Sea towards Korea and another from Guangzhou through Malacca towards the Nicobar Islands, Sri Lanka and India, the eastern and northern shores of the Arabian Sea to the Euphrates River. In 863, the Chinese author Duan Chengshi (d. 863) provided a detailed description of the slave trade, ivory trade, and ambergris trade in a country called Bobali, which historians suggest was Berbera in Somalia. In Fustat, Egypt, the fame of Chinese ceramics there led to an enormous demand for Chinese goods; hence Chinese often travelled there. From this time period, the Arab merchant Shulama once wrote of his admiration for Chinese seafaring junks, but noted that their draft was too deep for them to enter the Euphrates River, which forced them to ferry passengers and cargo in small boats. Shulama also noted that Chinese ships were often very large, with capacities up to 700 passengers.

== Culture and society ==
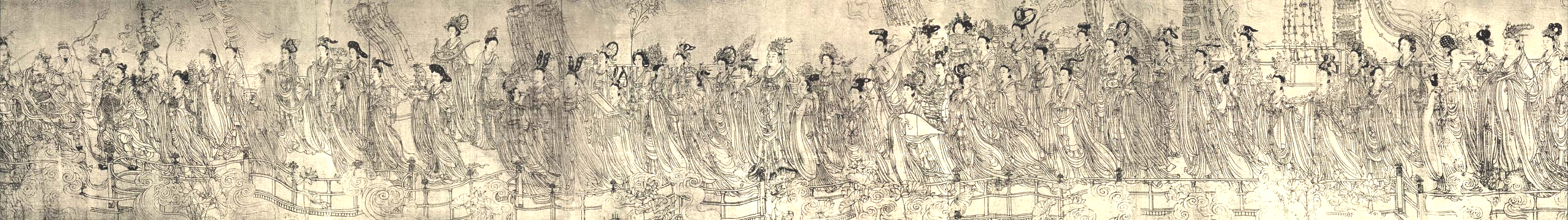
Eighty Seven Celestials, draft painting of a fresco by Wu Daozi (c. 685 – c. 758)

Both the Sui and Tang dynasties had turned away from the more feudal culture of the preceding Northern Dynasties, in favour of staunch civil Confucianism. The governmental system was supported by a large class of Confucian intellectuals selected through either civil service examinations or recommendations. In the Tang period, Taoism and Buddhism were commonly practised ideologies that played a large role in people's daily lives. The Tang Chinese enjoyed feasting, drinking, holidays, sports, and all sorts of entertainment, while Chinese literature blossomed and was more widely accessible with new printing methods. Rich commoners and nobles who worshipped spirits wanted them to know "how important and how admirable they were", so they "wrote or commissioned their own obituaries" and buried figures along with their bodies to ward off evil spirits.

=== Chang'an ===
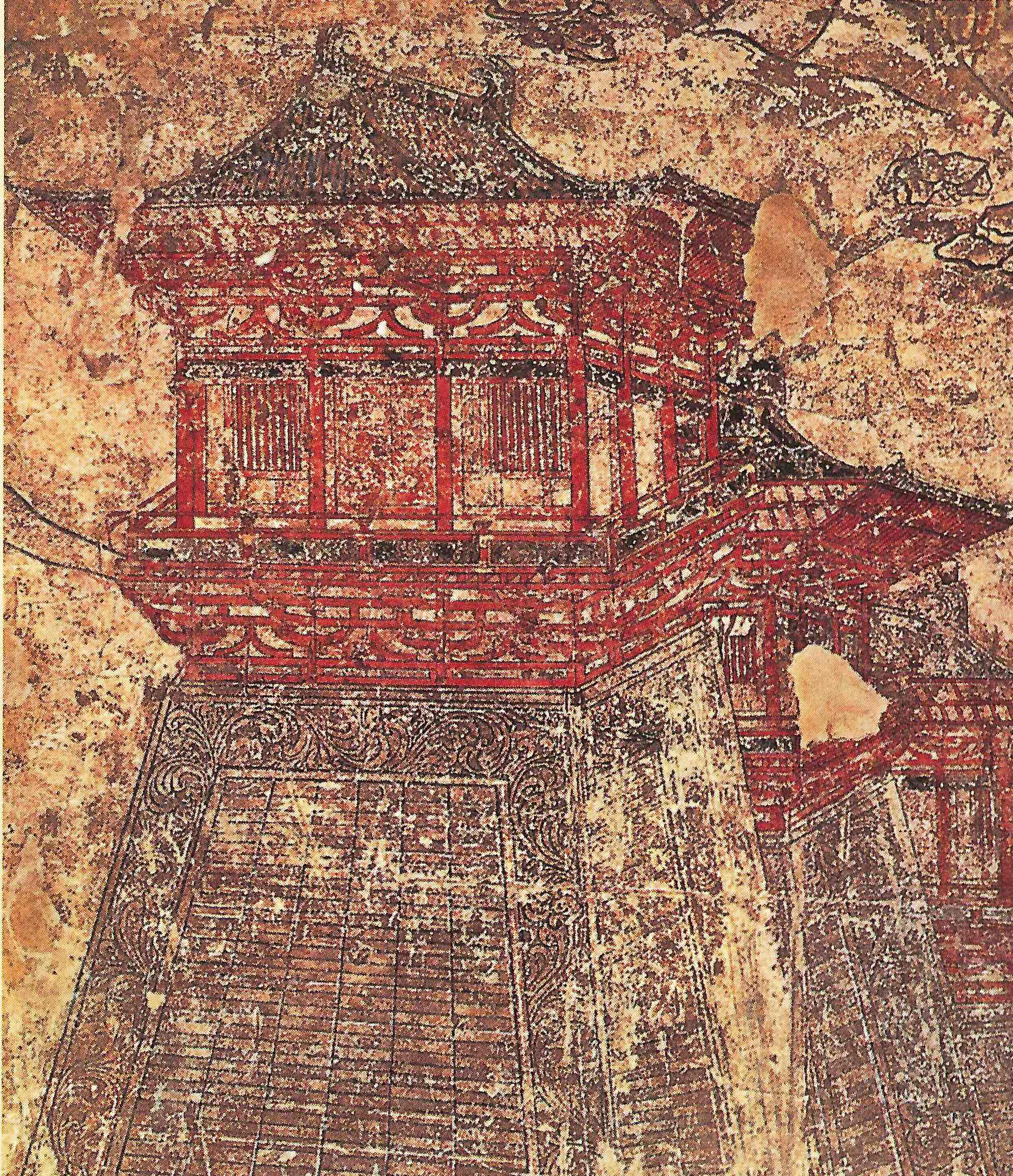
A 706 mural depicting a corner tower, most likely one of Chang'an, from the tomb of Prince Yide (d. 701) – the Qianling Mausoleum

Although Chang'an had served as the capital during the earlier Han and Jin dynasties, after subsequent destruction in warfare, it was the Sui dynasty model that comprised the Tang-era capital. The roughly square dimensions of the city had 10 km (6.2 mi) of outer walls running east to west, and more than 8 km (5.0 mi) of outer walls running north to south. The royal palace, the Taiji Palace, stood north of the city's central axis. From the large Mingde Gates mid-center on the main southern wall, a wide city avenue stretched all the way north to the central administrative city, behind which was the Chentian Gate of the royal palace, or Imperial City. Intersecting this were fourteen main streets running east to west, while eleven main streets ran north to south. These main intersecting roads formed 108 rectangular wards with walls and four gates each, each filled with multiple city blocks. The city was made famous for this checkerboard pattern of main roads with walled and gated districts, its layout even mentioned in one of Du Fu's poems. During the Heian period, cities like Heian-kyō (present-day Kyoto) were arranged in the checkerboard street in accordance with traditional geomancy, following the Chang'an model. Of Chang'an's 108 wards, two were designated as government-supervised markets, and other space reserved for temples, gardens, ponds, etc. Throughout the entire city, there were 111 Buddhist monasteries, 41 Taoist abbeys, 38 family shrines, 2 official temples, 7 churches of foreign religions, 10 city wards with provincial transmission offices, 12 major inns, and 6 graveyards. Some city wards were literally filled with open public playing fields or the backyards of lavish mansions for playing horse polo and cuju (Chinese soccer). In 662, Emperor Gaozong moved the imperial court to the Daming Palace, which became the political center of the empire and served as the royal residence of the Tang emperors for more than 220 years.

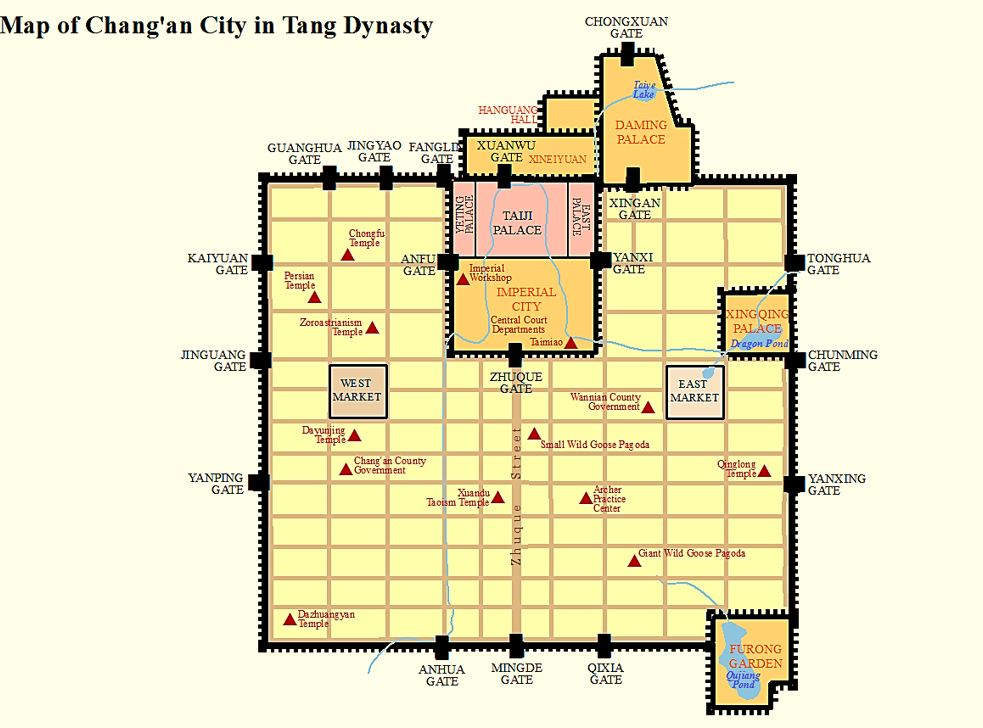
Map of Chang'an during the Tang

The Tang capital was the largest city in the world at its time, with the population of its wards and suburban countryside reaching two million inhabitants. The Tang capital was very cosmopolitan, with ethnicities of Persia, Central Asia, Japan, Korea, Vietnam, Tibet, India, and many other places living within. Naturally, with this plethora of different ethnicities living in Chang'an, there were also many different practised religions, such as Buddhism, Nestorian Christianity, Islam and Zoroastrianism, among others. With the open access to China that the Silk Road to the west facilitated, many foreign settlers were able to move east to China, while the city of Chang'an itself had about 25,000 foreigners living within. Exotic green-eyed, blond-haired Tocharian ladies serving wine in agate and amber cups, singing, and dancing at taverns attracted customers. If a foreigner in China pursued a Chinese woman for marriage, he was required to stay in China and was unable to take his bride back to his homeland, as stated in a law passed in 628 to protect women from temporary marriages with foreign envoys. Several laws enforcing segregation of foreigners from Chinese were passed during the Tang. In 779, the Tang issued an edict which forced Uyghurs in the capital, Chang'an, to wear their ethnic dress, stopped them from marrying Chinese females, and banned them from passing off as Chinese.

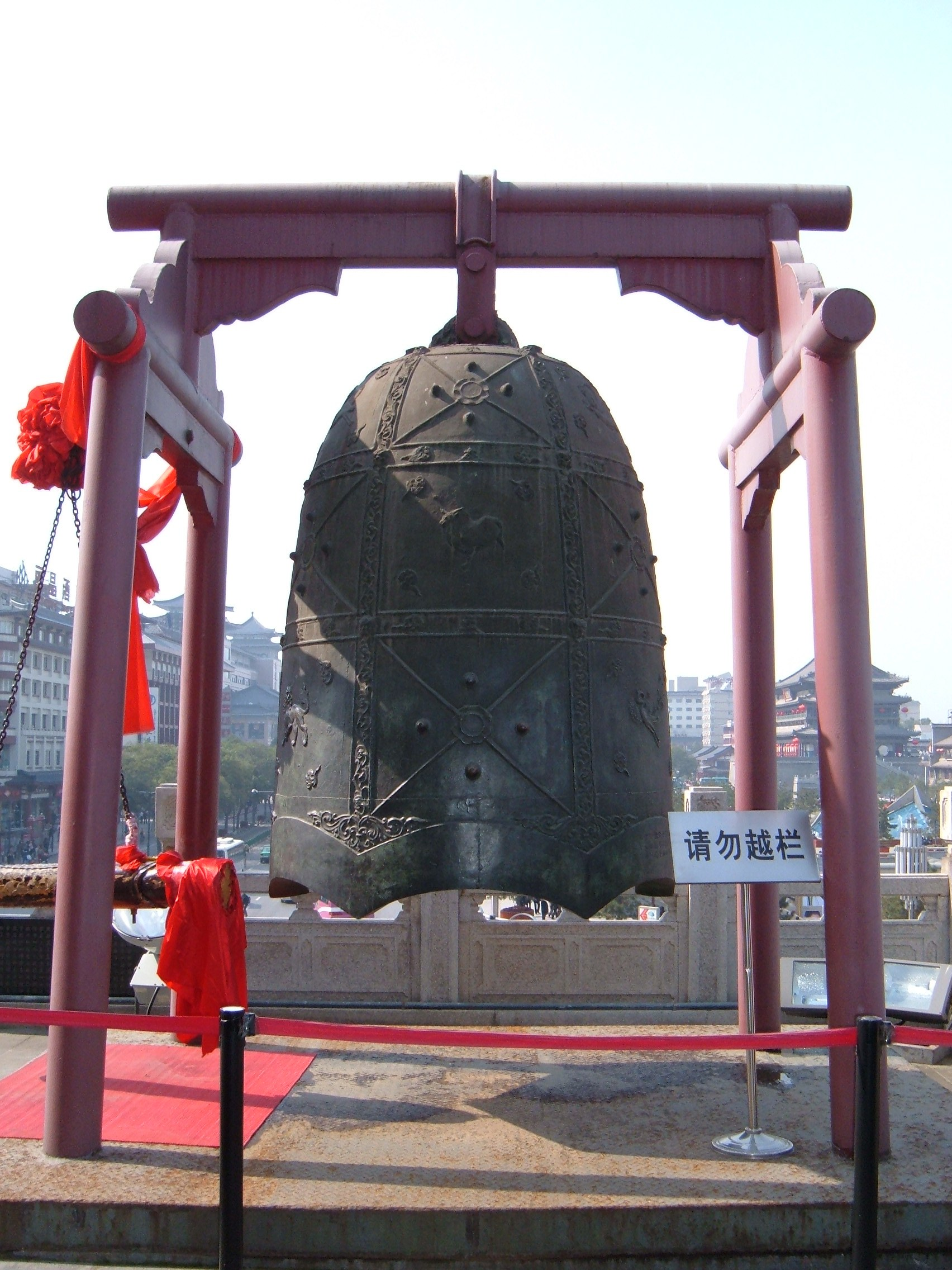
The bronze Jingyun Bell cast in 711, 247 cm (97 in) high and weighing 6,500 kg (14,300 lb), now in the Xi'an Bell Tower

Chang'an was the center of the central government, the home of the imperial family, and was filled with splendor and wealth. However, incidentally it was not the economic hub during the Tang dynasty. The city of Yangzhou along the Grand Canal and close to the Yangtze was the greatest economic center during the Tang.

Yangzhou was the headquarters for the Tang government's salt monopoly, and was the greatest industrial center of China. It acted as a midpoint in shipping of foreign goods to be distributed to the major cities of the north. Much like the seaport of Guangzhou in the south, Yangzhou had thousands of foreign traders from across Asia.

There was also the secondary capital city of Luoyang, which was the favoured capital of the two by Empress Wu. In 691, she had more than 100,000 families from the region around Chang'an move to Luoyang. With a population of about a million, Luoyang became the second largest city in the empire, and with its closeness to the Luo River it benefited from southern agricultural fertility and trade traffic of the Grand Canal. However, the Tang court eventually demoted its capital status and did not visit Luoyang after 743, when Chang'an's problem of acquiring adequate supplies and stores for the year was solved. As early as 736, granaries were built at critical points along the route from Yangzhou to Chang'an, which eliminated shipment delays, spoilage, and pilfering. An artificial lake used as a transshipment pool was dredged east of Chang'an in 743, where curious northerners could finally see the array of boats found in southern China, delivering tax and tribute items to the imperial court.

=== Literature ===
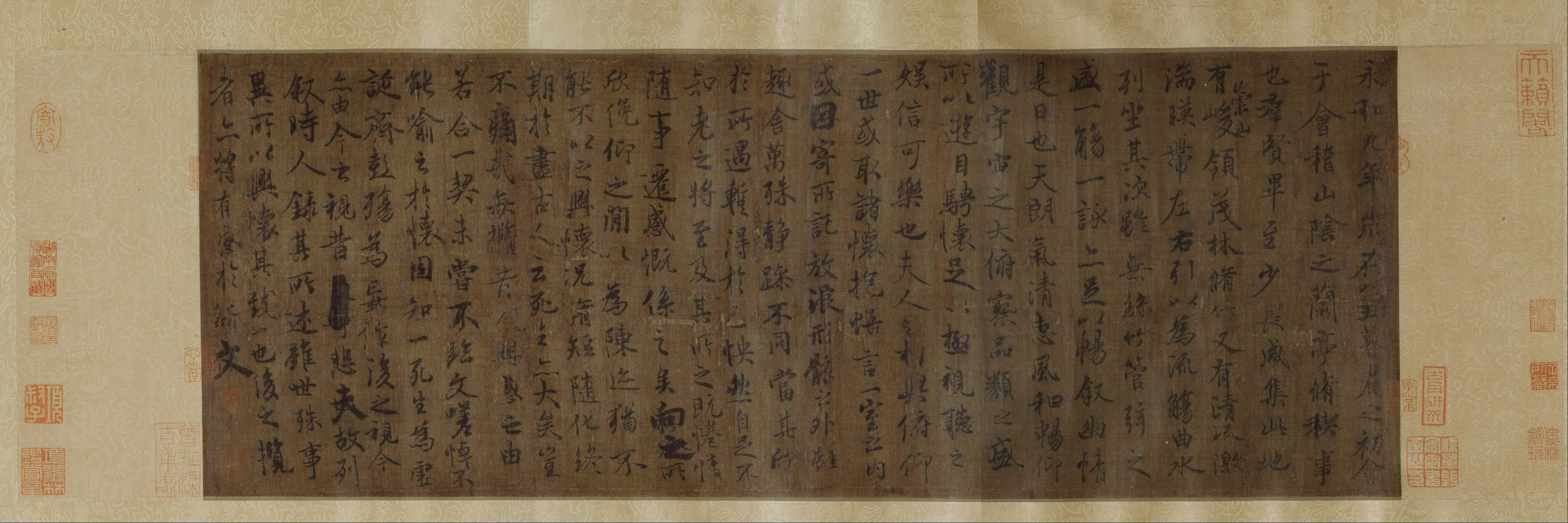
A Tang-era copy of the preface to the Lantingji Xu poems composed at the Orchid Pavilion Gathering, originally attributed to Wang Xizhi (303–361) of the Jin dynasty

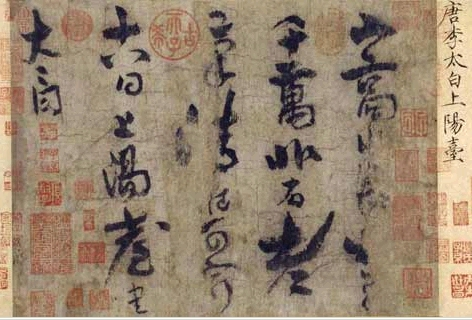
A poem by Li Bai (701–762), the only surviving example of Li Bai's calligraphy, housed in the Palace Museum in Beijing

The Tang dynasty was a golden age of Chinese literature and art. Over 48,900 poems penned during the Tang, representing over 2,200 authors, have survived to the present day. Skill in the composition of poetry became a required study for those wishing to pass imperial examinations, while poetry was also heavily competitive; poetry contests among guests at banquets and courtiers were common. Poetry styles that were popular in the Tang included gushi and jintishi, with the poet Li Bai (701–762) famous for the former style, and poets like Wang Wei (701–761) and Cui Hao (704–754) famous for their use of the latter. Jintishi poetry, or regulated verse, employed stanzas of eight lines, each consisting of five or seven characters with a fixed pattern of tones, and required the second and third couplets to be antithetical. Tang poems remained popular and great emulation of Tang era poetry began in the Song dynasty; in that period, Yan Yu (嚴羽; fl. 1194–1245) was the first to confer the poetry of the High Tang (c. 713 – 766) with "canonical status within the classical poetic tradition". Yan Yu reserved the position of highest esteem among all Tang poets for Du Fu (712–770), who was not viewed as such in his own era, and was branded by his peers as an anti-traditional rebel.

The Classical Prose Movement was spurred in large part by the writings of Tang authors Liu Zongyuan (773–819) and Han Yu (768–824). This new prose style broke away from the poetry tradition of piantiwen (駢體文; 'parallel prose') style begun in the Han dynasty. Although writers of the Classical Prose Movement imitated piantiwen, they criticised it for its often vague content and lack of colloquial language, focusing more on clarity and precision to make their writing more direct. This guwen (archaic prose) style can be traced back to Han Yu, and would become largely associated with orthodox Neo-Confucianism.

Short story fiction and tales were also popular during the Tang, one of the more famous ones being Yingying's Biography by Yuan Zhen (779–831), which was widely circulated in his own time and by the Yuan dynasty (1279–1368) became the basis for Chinese opera. Timothy C. Wong places this story within the wider context of Tang love tales, which often share the plot designs of quick passion, inescapable societal pressure leading to the abandonment of romance, followed by a period of melancholy. Wong states that this scheme lacks the undying vows and total self-commitment to love found in Western romances such as Romeo and Juliet, but that underlying traditional Chinese values of indivisibility of self from one's environment, including from society, served to create the necessary fictional device of romantic tension. In addition, Tang literature often discussed gender expression. Literary texts such as "Tiandi yinyang jiaohuan dale fu" and "You xianku" depicted how the Tang nobility emphasized Taoist sexology. Many male Tang poets and literati conveyed their love for male companions when they perceived their wives—often illiterate—to be incapable of understanding their troubles.

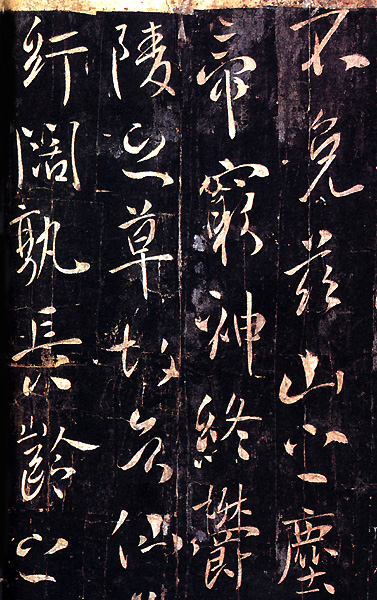
Calligraphy by Emperor Taizong on a Tang stele

Large encyclopaedias were published during the Tang: the Yiwen Leiju was compiled in 624 under chief editor Ouyang Xun (557–641), Linghu Defen (582–666) and Chen Shuda (d. 635). By 729, the team led by scholar Gautama Siddha (fl. 8th century), an ethnic Indian born in Chang'an, had finished compiling the Treatise on Astrology of the Kaiyuan Era, an astrological encyclopaedia.

Chinese geographers, such as Jia Dan, wrote accurate descriptions of places far beyond Tang territory. In his work written between 785 and 805, Jia described the sea route going into the mouth of the Persian Gulf, and that the medieval Iranians had erected 'ornamental pillars' in the sea that acted as lighthouse beacons for ships that might go astray. Arabic authors writing a century after Jia, such as al-Masudi and al-Maqdisi, also mentioned these structures in their accounts, confirming Jia's reports. The Tang diplomat Wang Xuance travelled to Magadha, in present-day northeast India, during the 7th century. Afterwards, he wrote the Zhang Tianzhu Guotu (Illustrated Accounts of Central India), a book which contained a large body of geographical information.

Many histories of previous dynasties were compiled between 636 and 659 by court officials during and shortly after the reign of Emperor Taizong of Tang. These included the Book of Liang, Book of Chen, Book of Northern Qi, Book of Zhou, Book of Sui, Book of Jin, History of Northern Dynasties and the History of Southern Dynasties. Although not included in the official Twenty-Four Histories, the Tongdian and Tang Huiyao were nonetheless valuable written historical works of the Tang period. The Shitong written by Liu Zhiji in 710, was a meta-history that surveyed the tradition of Chinese historiography to date. The Great Tang Records on the Western Regions, compiled by Bianji, recounted the journey of Xuanzang, the Tang era's most renowned Buddhist monk.

Other important literature included Duan Chengshi's (d. 863) Miscellaneous Morsels from Youyang, an entertaining collection of foreign legends and hearsay, reports on natural phenomena, short anecdotes, mythical and mundane tales, as well as notes on various subjects. The exact literary category or classification that Duan's large informal narrative would fit into is still debated among scholars and historians.

=== Religion and philosophy ===
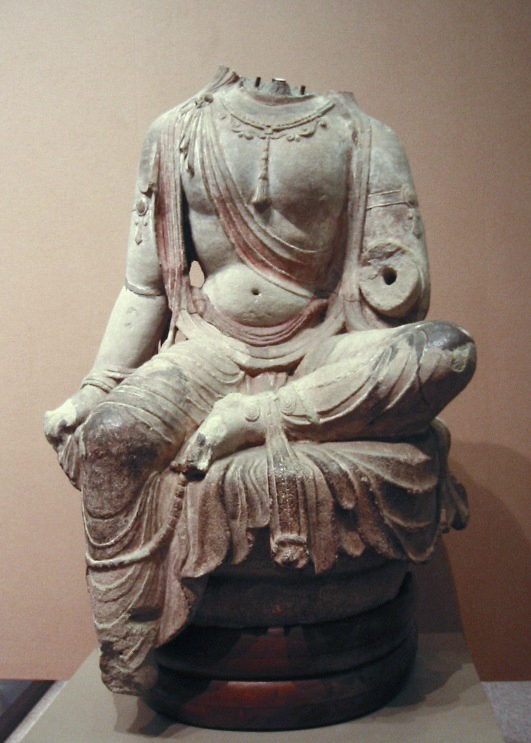
A Tang dynasty sculpture of a Bodhisattva

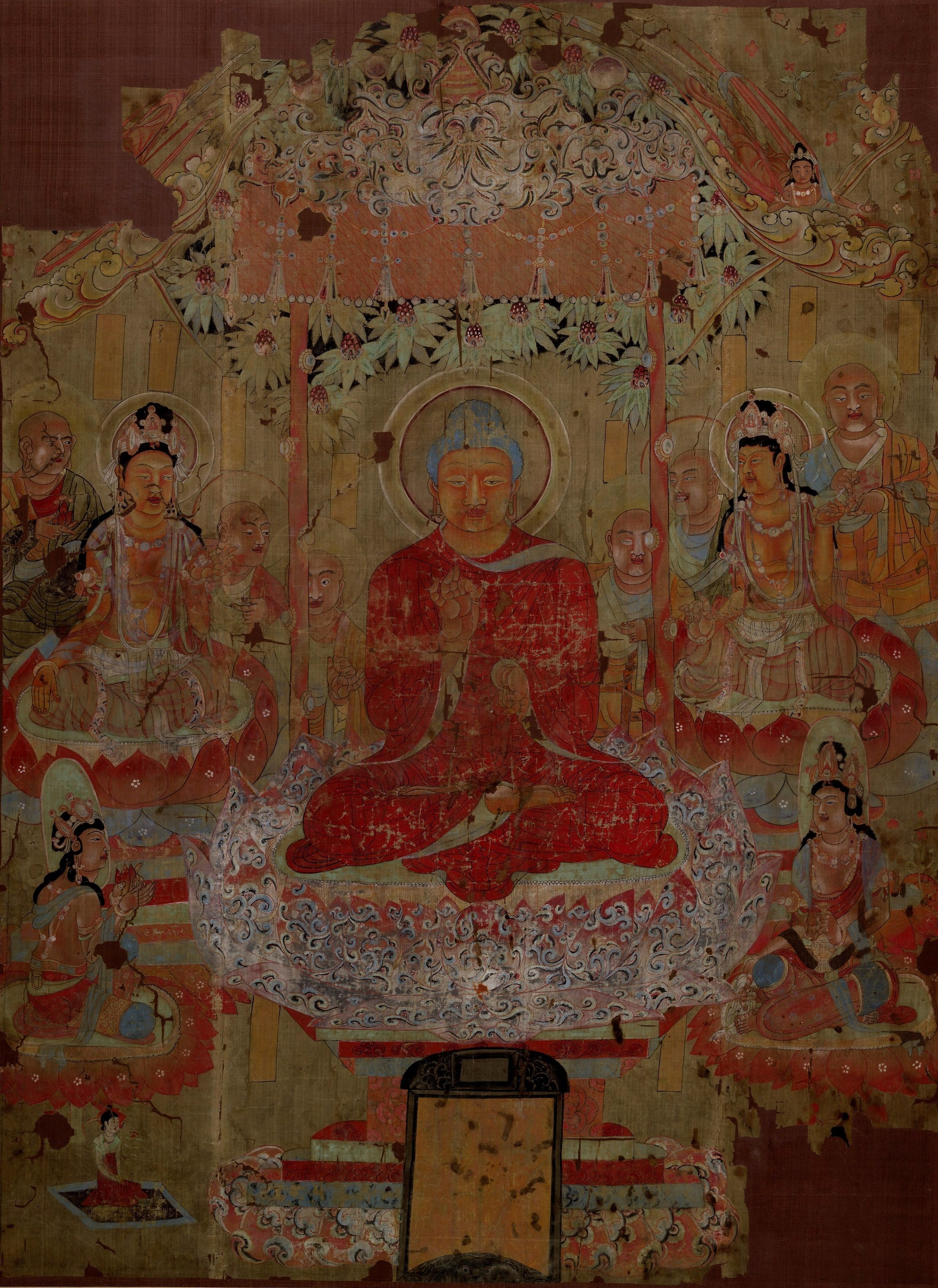
An 8th-century silk wall scroll from Dunhuang, showing the paradise of Amitabha

Since ancient times, some Chinese had believed in folk religion and Taoism that incorporated many deities. Practitioners believed the Tao and the afterlife was a reality parallel to the living world, complete with its own bureaucracy and afterlife currency needed by dead ancestors. Funerary practices included providing the deceased with everything they might need in the afterlife, including animals, servants, entertainers, hunters, homes, and officials. This ideal is reflected in Tang art. This is also reflected in many short stories written in the Tang about people accidentally winding up in the realm of the dead, only to come back and report their experiences. Taoist ideologies surrounding the medical and health benefits of heterosexuality pervaded. Although such ideologies did not necessarily prevent homosexual or bisexual practices, they advocated for a blueprint of health and wellness that conformed to heterosexuality.

Buddhism, originating in India around the time of Confucius, continued its influence during the Tang period and was accepted by some members of imperial family, becoming thoroughly sinicised and a permanent part of Chinese traditional culture. In an age before Neo-Confucianism and figures such as Zhu Xi (1130–1200), Buddhism had begun to flourish in China during the Northern and Southern dynasties, and became the dominant ideology during the prosperous Tang. Buddhist monasteries played an integral role in Chinese society, offering lodging for travellers in remote areas, schools for children throughout the country, and a place for urban literati to stage social events and gatherings such as going-away parties. Buddhist monasteries were also engaged in the economy, since their land property and serfs gave them enough revenues to set up mills, oil presses, and other enterprises. Although the monasteries retained 'serfs', these monastery dependents could actually own property and employ others to help them in their work, including their own slaves.

The prominent status of Buddhism in Chinese culture began to decline as the dynasty and central government declined as well during the late 8th century to 9th century. Buddhist convents and temples that were exempt from state taxes beforehand were targeted by the state for taxation. In 845, Emperor Wuzong finally shut down 4,600 Buddhist monasteries along with 40,000 temples and shrines, forcing 260,000 Buddhist monks and nuns to return to secular] life; this episode would later be dubbed one of the Four Buddhist Persecutions in China. Although the ban was lifted just a few years after, Buddhism never regained its once dominant status in Chinese culture. This situation also came about through a revival of interest in native Chinese philosophies such as Confucianism and Taoism. Han Yu (786–824)—who Arthur F. Wright stated was a "brilliant polemicist and ardent xenophobe"—was one of the first men of the Tang to denounce Buddhism. Although his contemporaries found him crude and obnoxious, he foreshadowed the later persecution of Buddhism in the Tang, as well as the revival of Confucian theory with the rise of Neo-Confucianism of the Song dynasty. Nonetheless, Chán Buddhism gained popularity among the educated elite. There were also many famous Chan monks from the Tang era, such as Mazu Daoyi, Baizhang, and Huangbo Xiyun. The sect of Pure Land Buddhism initiated by the Chinese monk Huiyuan (334–416) was also just as popular as Chan Buddhism during the Tang.

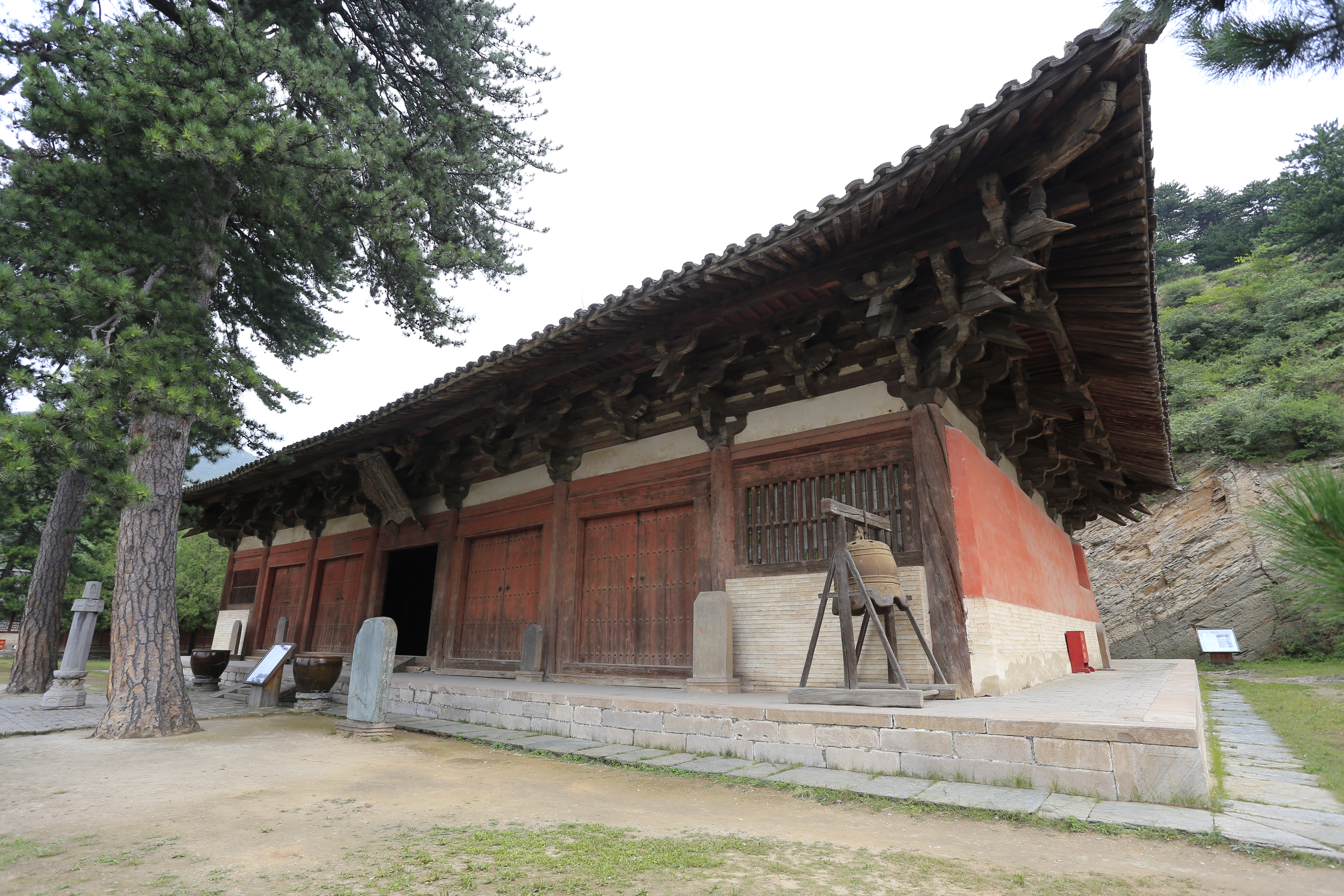
A timber hall built in 857, located at the Buddhist Foguang Temple of Mount Wutai, Shanxi

Rivaling Buddhism was Taoism, a native Chinese philosophical and religious belief system that found its roots in the Tao Te Ching and the Zhuangzi. The ruling Li family of the Tang dynasty actually claimed descent from Laozi, traditionally credited as the author of the Tao Te Ching. On numerous occasions where Tang princes would become crown prince or Tang princesses taking vows as Taoist priestesses, their lavish former mansions would be converted into Taoist abbeys and places of worship. Many Taoists were associated with alchemy in their pursuits to find an elixir of immortality and a means to create gold from concocted mixtures of many other elements. Although they never achieved their goals in either of these futile pursuits, they did contribute to the discovery of new metal alloys, porcelain products, and new dyes. The historian Joseph Needham labelled the work of the Taoist alchemists as "protoscience rather than pseudoscience". However, the close connection between Taoism and alchemy, which some sinologists have asserted, is refuted by Nathan Sivin, who states that alchemy was just as prominent (if not more so) in the secular sphere and practised more often by laymen.

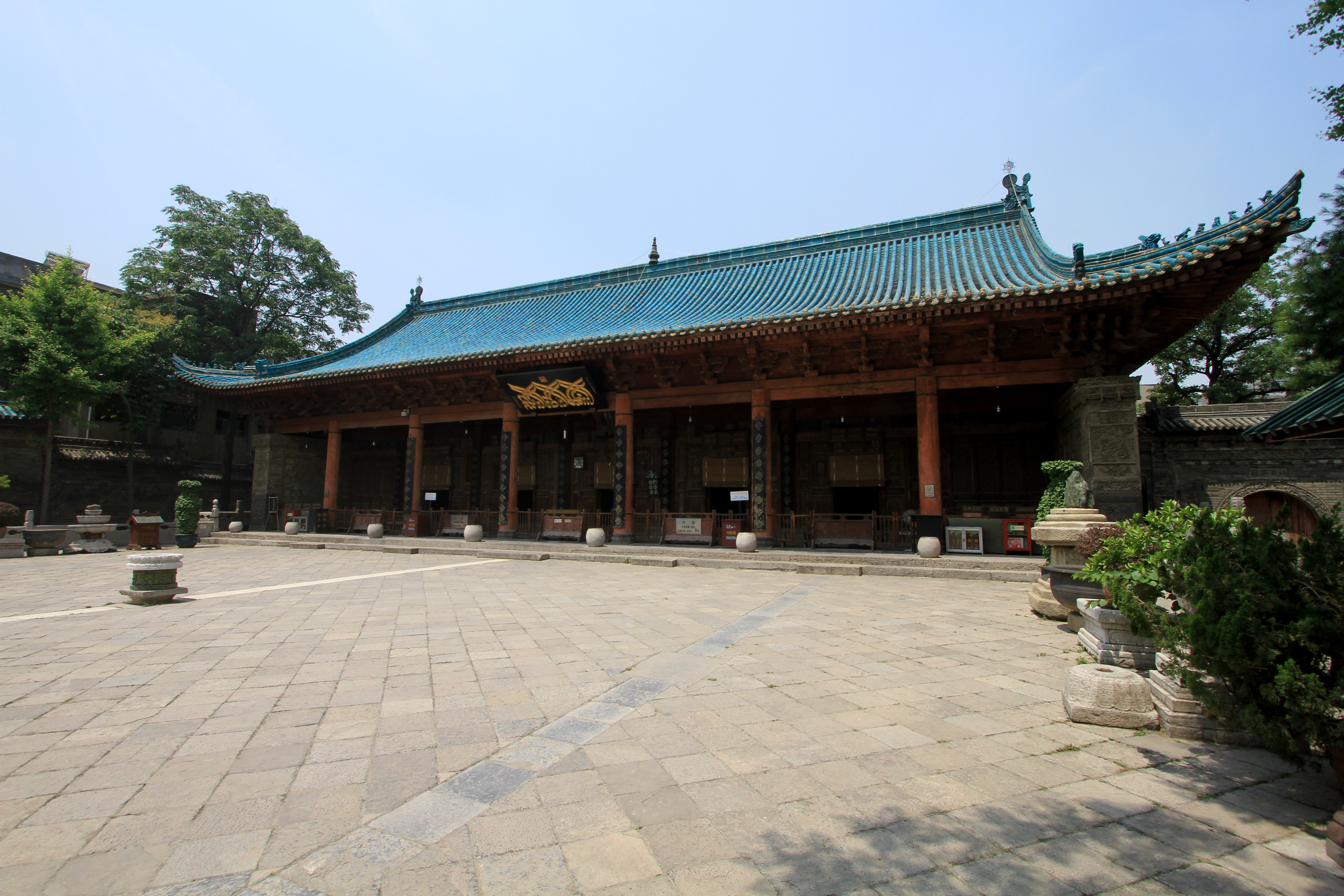
Prayer hall of the Great Mosque of Xi'an

Islam was introduced to China during the early Tang dynasty, from the Chang'an to Fujian-Guandong. Chinese scholars consider the second year of Tang Yonghui regin (651 AD) as the year when Islam was introduced to China, the first Muslims were merchant that did business through the overland and maritime Silk Road settled inland in Chang'an but also in the coast cities of Guangzhou and Quanzhou. The Great Mosque of Xi'an was built in 742 CE during the Tang dynasty, other historical Tang-era mosques that remain standing to this day are the Huaisheng Mosque and the Xianxian Mosque both in Guangzhou.

Nestorian Christianity
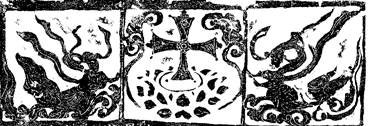

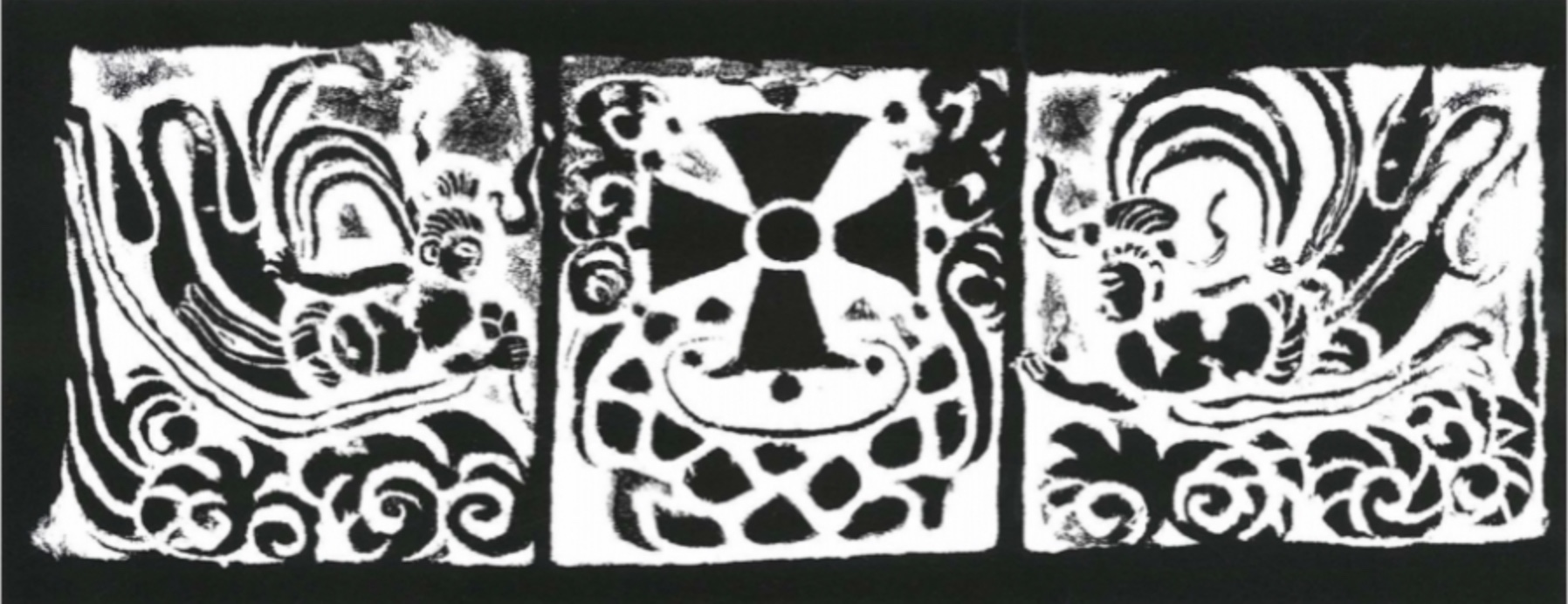
Details of the rubbing of the Nestorian pillar of Luoyang

The Church of the East's greatest geographical extent during the Middle Ages

The Tang dynasty also officially recognised various foreign religions. The Assyrian Church of the East, otherwise known as the Nestorian Church or the Church of the East in China, was given recognition by the Tang court. In 781, the Nestorian Stele was created in order to honour the achievements of their community in China. A Christian monastery was established in Shaanxi province where the Daqin Pagoda still stands, and inside the pagoda there is Christian-themed artwork. Although the religion largely died out after the Tang, it was revived in China following the Mongol invasions of the 13th century.

Although the Sogdians had been responsible for transmitting Buddhism to China from India during the 2nd–4th centuries, soon afterwards they largely converted to Zoroastrianism due to their links to Sasanian Persia. Sogdian merchants and their families living in cities such as Chang'an, Luoyang, and Xiangyang usually built a Zoroastrian temple once their local communities grew larger than 100 households. Sogdians were also responsible for spreading Manicheism in China and the Uyghur Khaganate. The Uyghurs built the first Manichean monastery in China in 768; in 843, the Tang government ordered that the property of all Manichean monasteries be confiscated in response to the outbreak of war with the Uyghurs. With the blanket ban on foreign religions two years later, Manicheism was driven underground and never flourished in China again.

=== Leisure ===
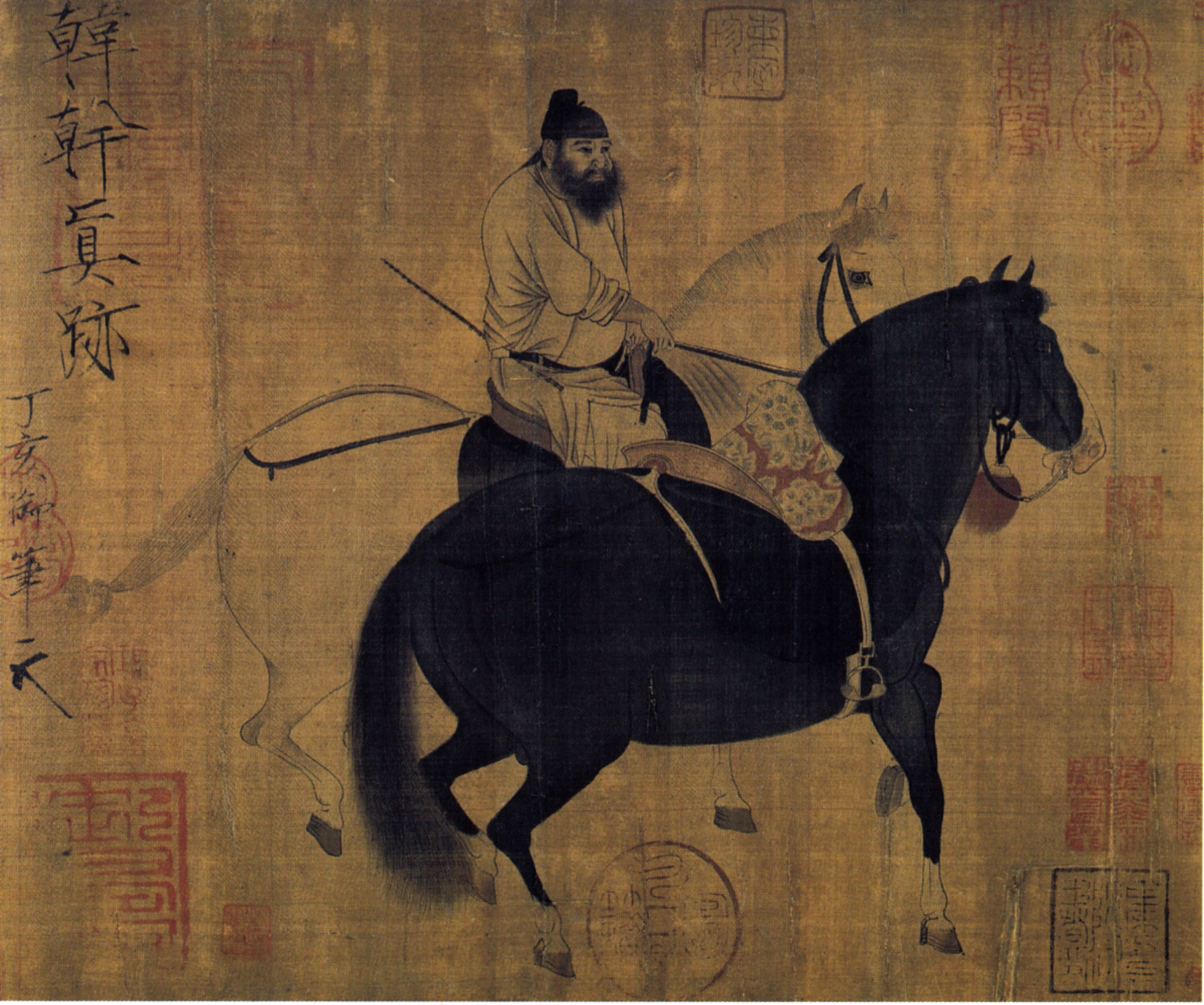
A Man Herding Horses, by Han Gan (706–783), a court artist under Xuanzong

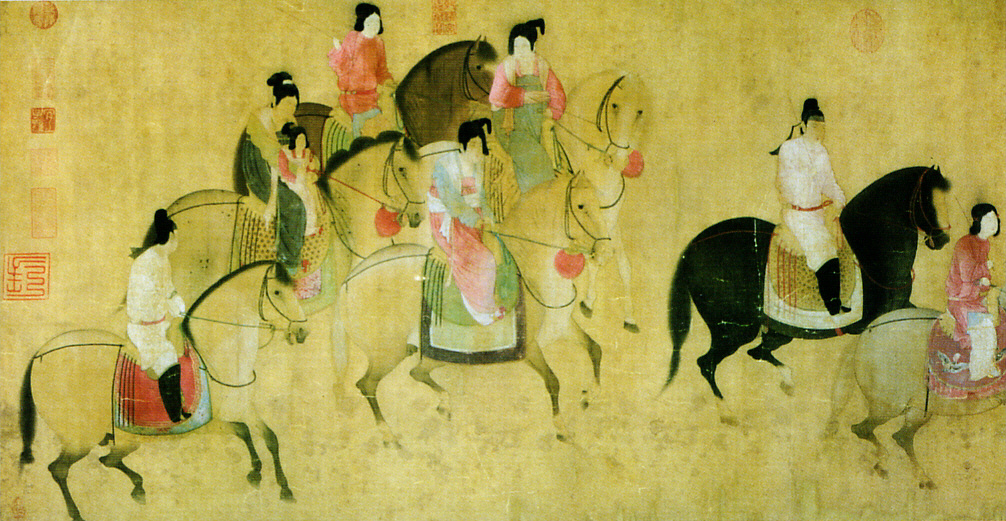
Spring Outing of the Tang Court, by Zhang Xuan (713–755)

More than earlier periods, the Tang era was renowned for the time reserved for leisure activities, especially among the upper classes. Many outdoor sports and activities were enjoyed during the Tang, including archery, hunting, horse polo, cuju (soccer), cockfighting, and even tug of war. Government officials were granted vacations during their tenure in office. Officials were granted 30 days off every three years to visit their parents if they lived 1,000 mi (1,600 km) away, or 15 days off if the parents lived more than 167 mi (269 km) away (travel time not included). Officials were granted nine days of vacation time for weddings of a son or daughter, and either five, three, or one days/day off for the nuptials of close relatives (travel time not included). Officials also received a total of three days off for their son's capping initiation rite into manhood, and one day off for the ceremony of initiation rite of a close relative's son. Among the royalty, the tradition of male homosexuality of Imperial China continued to exist, where eunuchs were often the royalty's male favorites, both due to their appearance and talents.

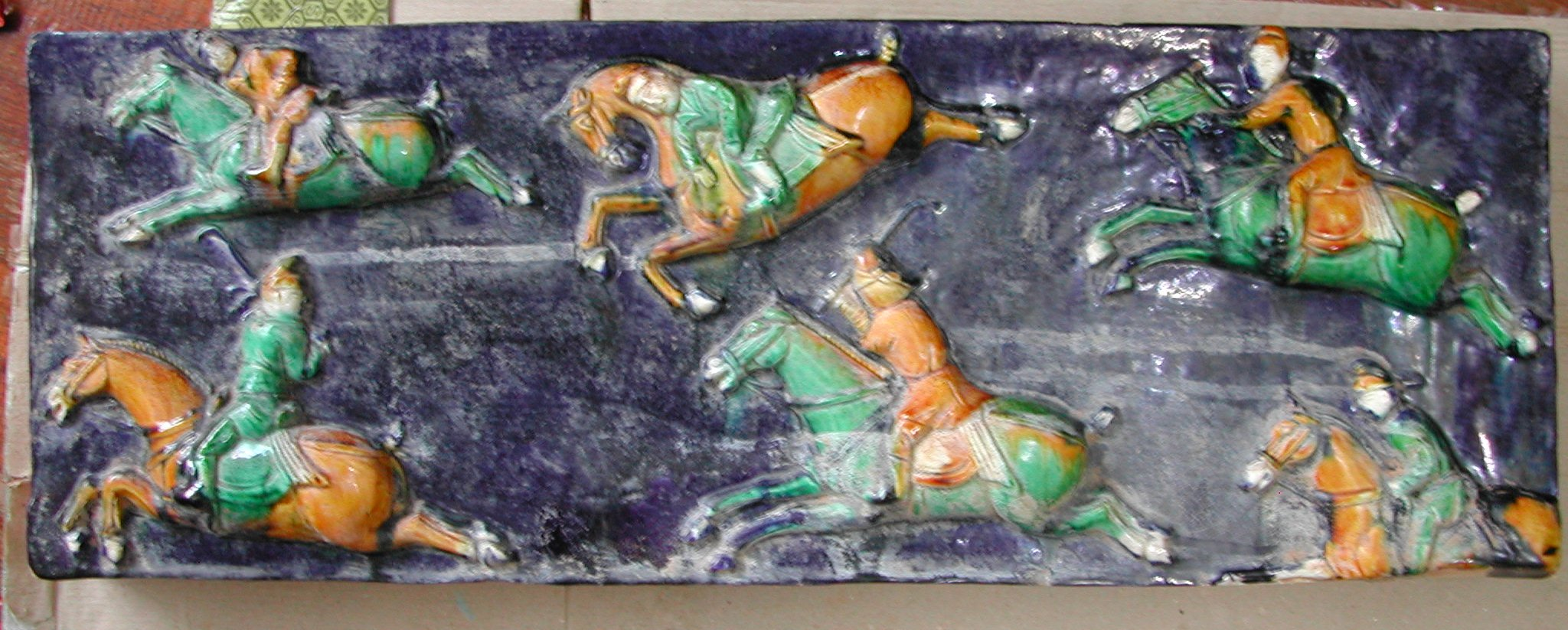
A Tang sancai-glazed carved relief showing horseback riders playing polo

Traditional Chinese holidays such as Chinese New Year, Lantern Festival, Cold Food Festival, and others were universal holidays. In Chang'an, there was always lively celebration, especially for the Lantern Festival since the city's nighttime curfew was lifted by the government for three days straight. Between 628 and 758, the imperial throne bestowed a total of sixty-nine grand carnivals nationwide, granted by the emperor in the case of special circumstances such as important military victories, abundant harvests after a long drought or famine, the granting of amnesties, or the instalment of a new crown prince. For special celebration in the Tang era, lavish and gargantuan-sized feasts were sometimes prepared, as the imperial court had staffed agencies to prepare the meals. This included a prepared feast for 1,100 elders of Chang'an in 664, a feast held for 3,500 officers of the Divine Strategy Army in 768, and one in 826 for 1,200 members of the imperial family and women of the palace. Alcohol consumption was a prominent facet of Chinese culture; people during the Tang drank for nearly every social event. An 8th-century court official allegedly had a serpent-shaped structure called the 'ale grotto' built on the ground floor using a total of 50,000 bricks, which featured bowls from which each of his friends could drink.

=== Position of women ===
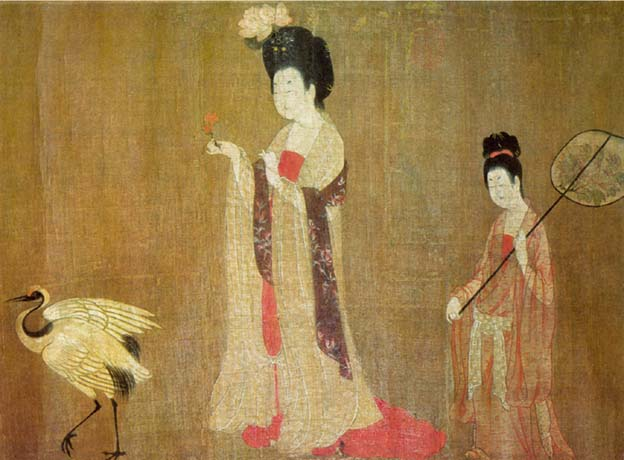
Beauties Wearing Flowers by Zhou Fang, 8th century

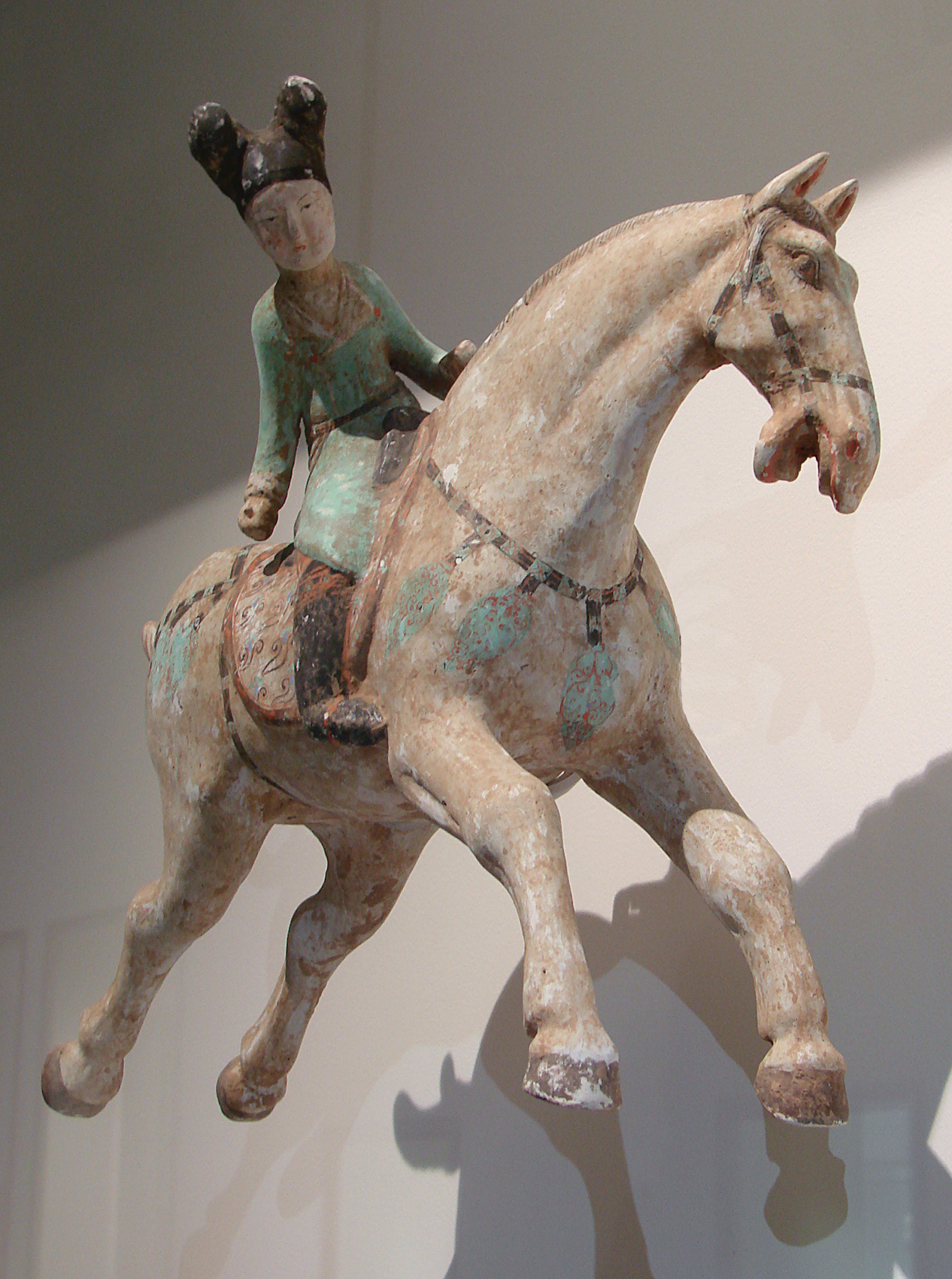
Woman playing polo, 8th century

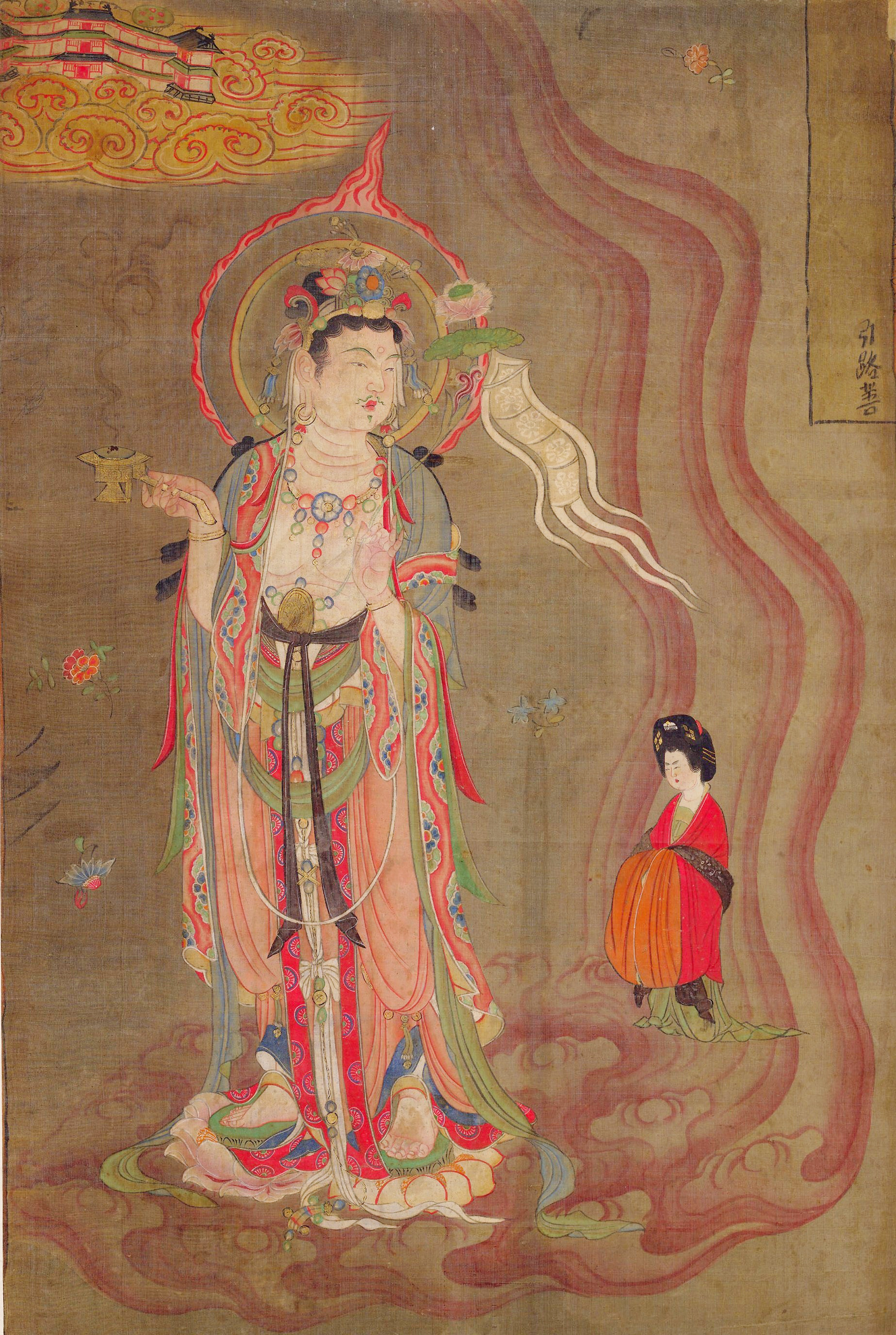
A late Tang or early Five Dynasties era silk painting on a banner depicting Guanyin and a female attendant in silk robes, from the Dunhuang caves – British Museum

Concepts of women's social rights and social status during the Tang era were notably liberal-minded for the period. However, this was largely reserved for urban women of elite status, as men and women in the rural countryside laboured hard in their different set of tasks; with wives and daughters responsible for more domestic tasks of weaving textiles and rearing of silk worms, while men tended to farming in the fields. There were many women in the Tang era who gained access to religious authority by taking vows as Taoist priestesses.

In Chang'an, ordinary courtesans inhabited the North Hamlet. They were generally knowledgeable in the rules of drinking games, and received particular training in table manners. While renowned for their politeness, courtesans were reputed to dominate conversations among elite men, and as being unafraid to openly criticise the rudeness of prominent male guests, including for talking too much, too loudly, or for boasting of their accomplishments. Courtesans were sometimes beaten by their procuring madames.

Gējìs, or professional singing courtesans, were culturally prominent, and joined talent agencies called jiaofang. The emperor selected particularly talented women from the outer jiaofang to form the spring court, who were supplemented by courtesans from other troupes. During the Tang, singing courtesans were also talented in the poetry. In addition to singing, some courtesans composed their own songs, and even popularised a new form of lyrical verse that incorporated quotations of famous historical figures.

It was fashionable for women to have full figures; men enjoyed the presence of assertive, active women. The foreign horse-riding sport of polo from Persia became a wildly popular trend among the Chinese elite, and women often played the sport (as glazed earthenware figurines from the time period portray). The preferred hairstyle for women was to bunch their hair up like "an elaborate edifice above the forehead", while affluent ladies wore extravagant head ornaments, combs, pearl necklaces, face powders, and perfumes. A 671 law attempted to force women to wear hats with veils again in order to promote decency, but these laws were ignored as some women started wearing caps and even no hats at all, as well as men's riding clothes and boots, and tight-sleeved bodices.

There were some prominent court women after the era of Empress Wu, such as Yang Guifei (719–756), who had Emperor Xuanzong appoint many of her relatives and cronies to important ministerial and martial positions.

=== Cuisine ===
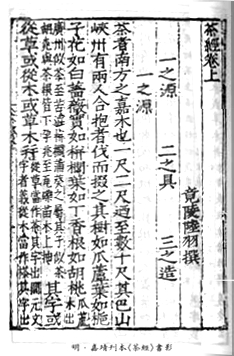
A page of The Classic of Tea by Tang era author Lu Yu

During the earlier Northern and Southern dynasties (420–589), and perhaps even earlier, the drinking of tea (Camellia sinensis) became popular in southern China. Tea was viewed then as a beverage of tasteful pleasure and with pharmacological purpose as well. During the Tang dynasty, tea became synonymous with everything sophisticated in society. The poet Lu Tong (790–835) devoted most of his poetry to his love of tea. The 8th-century author Lu Yu, known as the Sage of Tea, wrote a treatise on the art of drinking tea called The Classic of Tea. Although wrapping paper had been used in China since the 2nd century BC, during the Tang it was used as folded and sewn square bags to hold and preserve the flavor of tea leaves. This followed many other uses for paper such as the first recorded use of toilet paper in 589 by the scholar-official Yan Zhitui (531–591), confirmed in 851 by an Arab traveller who remarked that the Tang lacked cleanliness because they relied on toilet paper instead of washing themselves with water.

In ancient times, the Chinese had outlined the five most basic foodstuffs known as the five grains: sesamum, legumes, wheat, panicled millet, and glutinous millet. The Ming dynasty encyclopedist Song Yingxing noted that rice was not counted among the five grains from the time of the legendary and deified Chinese sage Shennong (the existence of whom Yingxing wrote was "an uncertain matter") into the 2nd millennium BC, because the properly wet and humid climate in southern China for growing rice was not yet fully settled or cultivated by the Chinese. Song Yingxing also noted that in the Ming dynasty, seven tenths of civilians' food was rice. During the Tang dynasty rice was not only the most important staple in southern China, but had also become popular in the north where central authority resided.

During the Tang dynasty, wheat replaced the position of millet and became the main staple crop. As a consequence, wheat cake shared a considerable amount in the staple of Tang. There were four main kinds of cake: steamed cake, boiled cake, pancake, and Hu cake. Steamed cake was consumed commonly by both civilians and aristocrats. Like rougamo in modern Chinese cuisine, steamed cake was usually stuffed with meat and vegetables. Boiled cake was the staple of the Northern Dynasties, and it kept its popularity in the Tang dynasty. It included a wide variety of dishes similar to modern wonton, noodles, and many other kinds of food that soak wheat in water. While aristocrats favoured wonton, civilians usually consumed noodles and noodle slice soup that were easier to produce. Pancakes was rare in China before the Tang, when it gained popularity. Hu cake was extremely popular during the Tang. Hu cake was toasted in the oven, covered with sesame seeds, and served at taverns, inns and shops. Japanese Buddhist monk Ennin observed that Hu cake was popular among all of China's civilians.

During the Tang, the many common foodstuffs and cooking ingredients in addition to those already listed were barley, garlic, salt, turnips, soybeans, pears, apricots, peaches, apples, pomegranates, jujubes, rhubarb, hazelnuts, pine nuts, chestnuts, walnuts, yams, taro, etc. The various meats that were consumed included pork, chicken, lamb (especially preferred in the north), sea otter, bear (which was hard to catch, but there were recipes for steamed, boiled, and marinated bear), and even Bactrian camels. In the south along the coast meat from seafood was by default the most common, as the Chinese enjoyed eating cooked jellyfish with cinnamon, Sichuan pepper, cardamom, and ginger, as well as oysters with wine, fried squid with ginger and vinegar, horseshoe crabs and red swimming crabs, shrimp and pufferfish, which the Chinese called "river piglet".

From the trade overseas and over land, the Chinese acquired peaches from Samarkand, date palms, pistachios, and figs from Persia, pine nuts and ginseng roots from Korea and mangoes from Southeast Asia. In China, there was a great demand for sugar; during the reign of Harsha over northern India (r. 606–647), Indian envoys to the Tang brought two makers of sugar who successfully taught the Chinese how to cultivate sugarcane. Cotton also came from India as a finished product from Bengal, although it was during the Tang that the Chinese began to grow and process cotton, and by the Yuan dynasty it became the prime textile fabric in China.

Some foods were off-limits, as the Tang court encouraged people not to eat beef. This was due to the role of the bull as a valuable working animal. From 831 to 833, Emperor Wenzong even banned the slaughter of cattle on the grounds of his religious convictions to Buddhism.

Methods of food preservation were important, and practised throughout China. The common people used simple methods of preservation, such as digging deep ditches and trenches, brining, and salting their foods. The emperor had large ice pits located in the parks in and around Chang'an for preserving food, while the wealthy and elite had their own smaller ice pits. Each year the emperor had labourers carve 1000 blocks of ice from frozen creeks in mountain valleys, each block with dimensions 0.9 m × 0.9 m × 1.1 m (2 ft 11 in × 2 ft 11 in × 3 ft 7 in) . Frozen delicacies such as chilled melon were enjoyed during the summer.

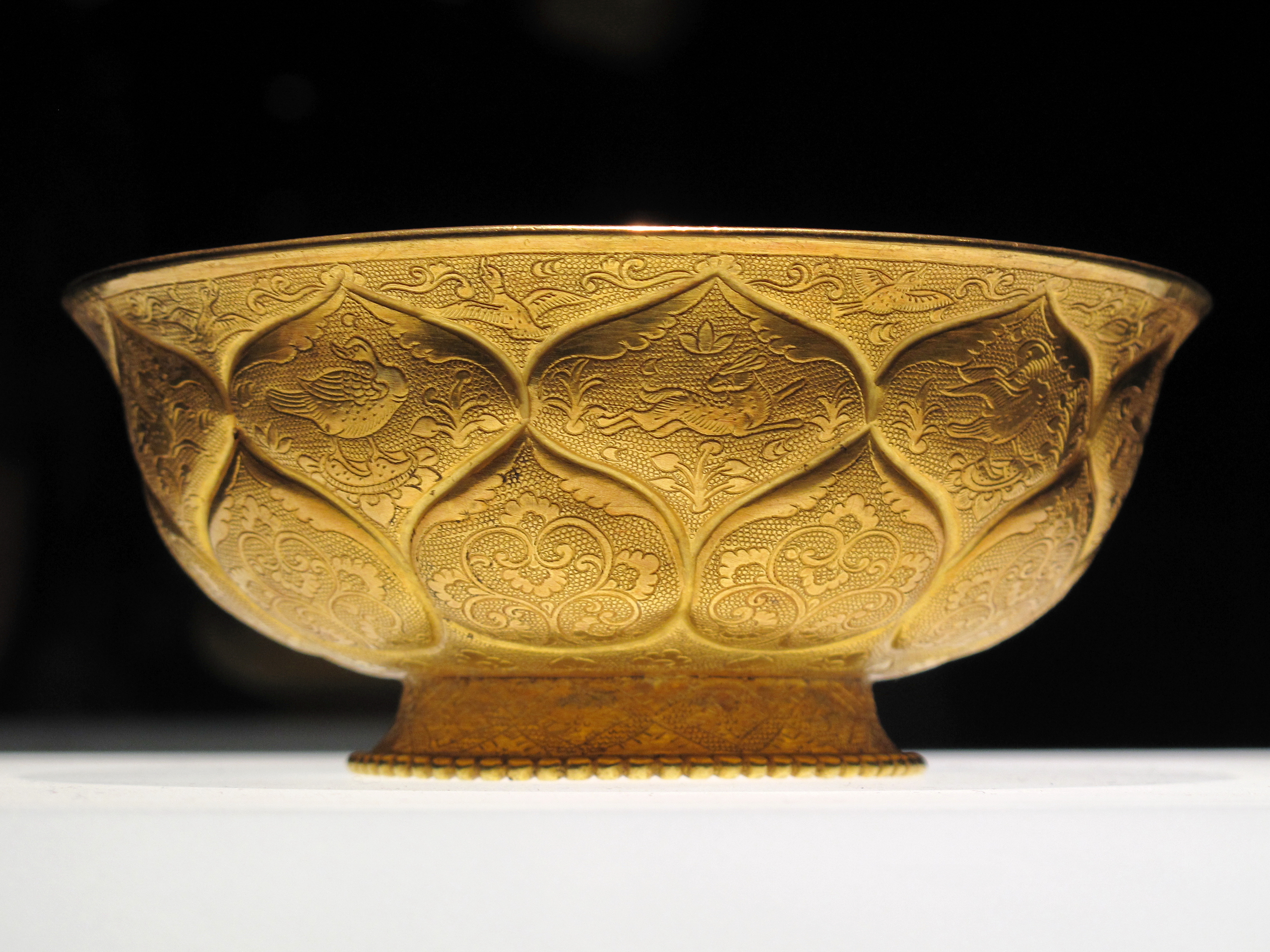
Tang era gilt-gold bowl with lotus and animal motifs

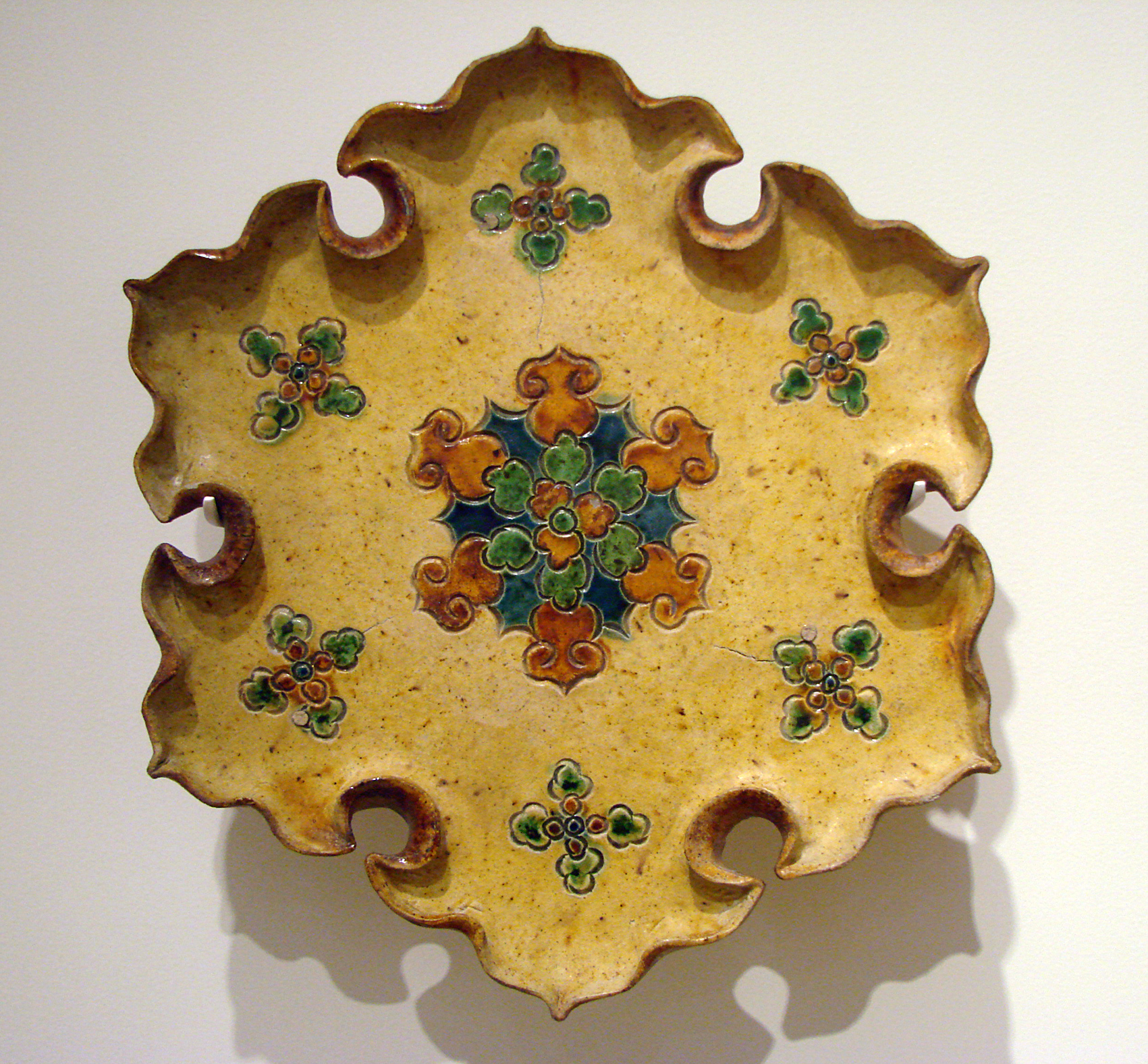
A Tang sancai-glazed lobed dish with incised decorations, 8th century

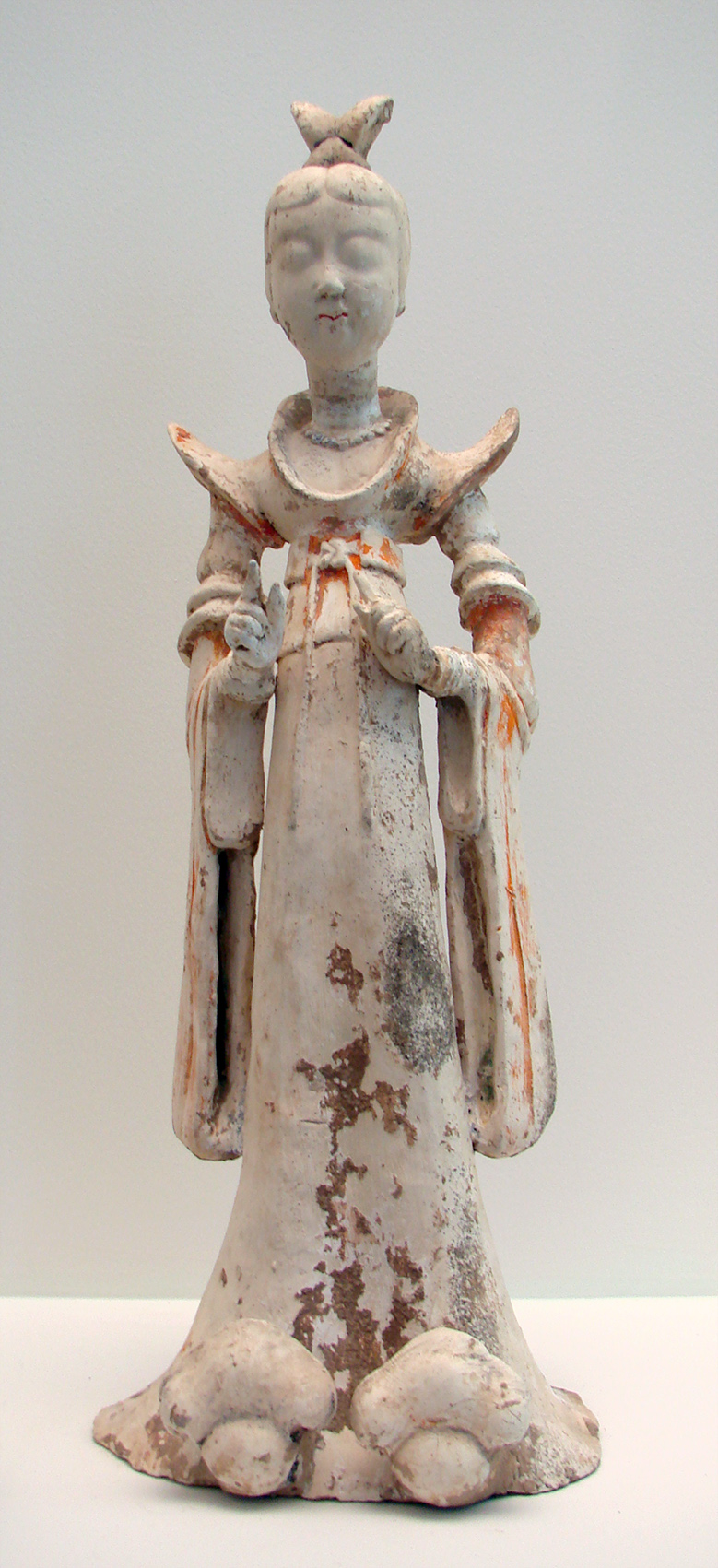
Tomb figure from the 7th–8th century of a lady attendant during the Tang era. Female hosts prepared feasts, tea parties, and played drinking games with their guests

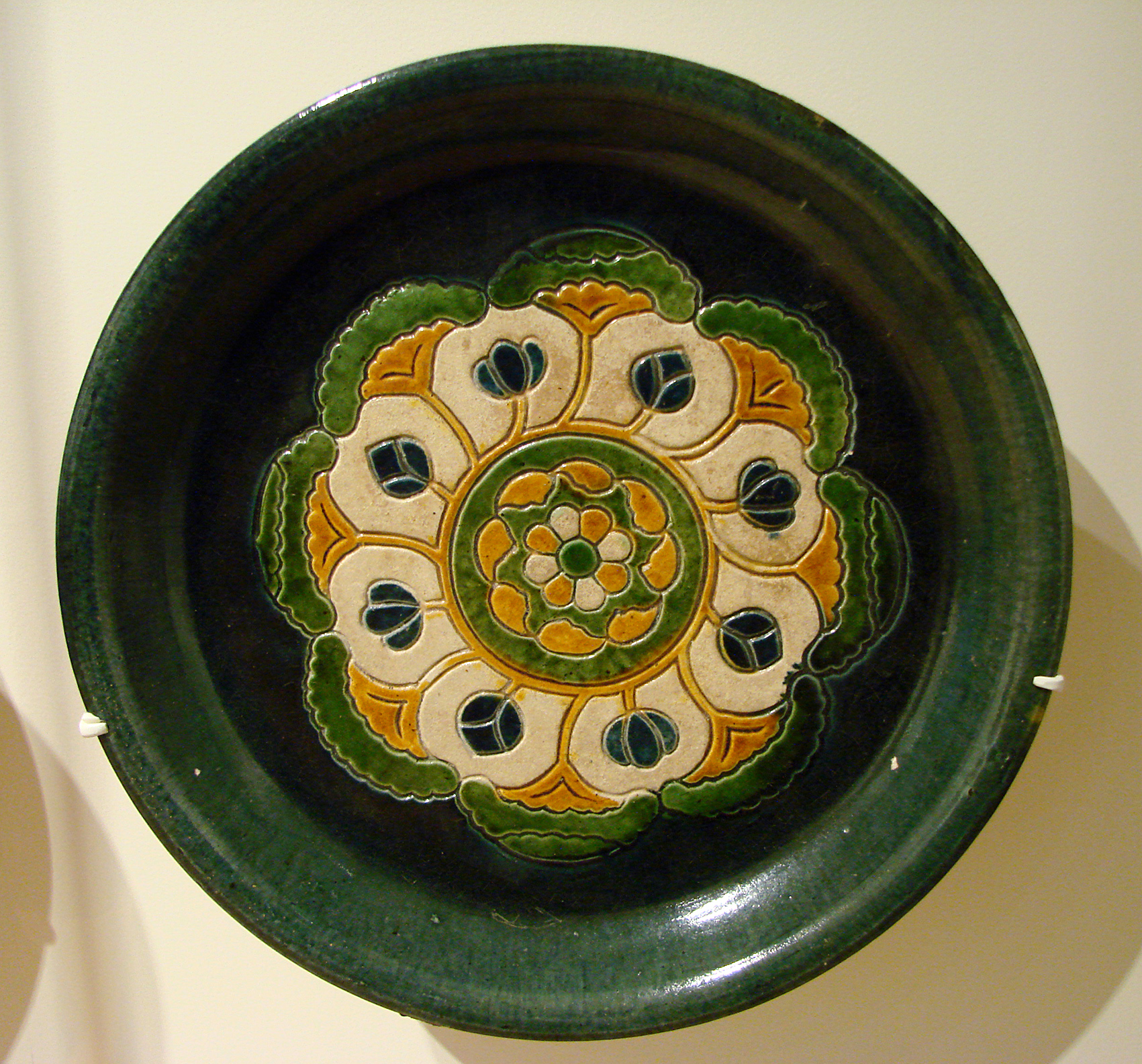
A rounded "offering plate" with design in "three colors" (sancai) glaze, 8th century

== Science and technology ==
=== Engineering ===
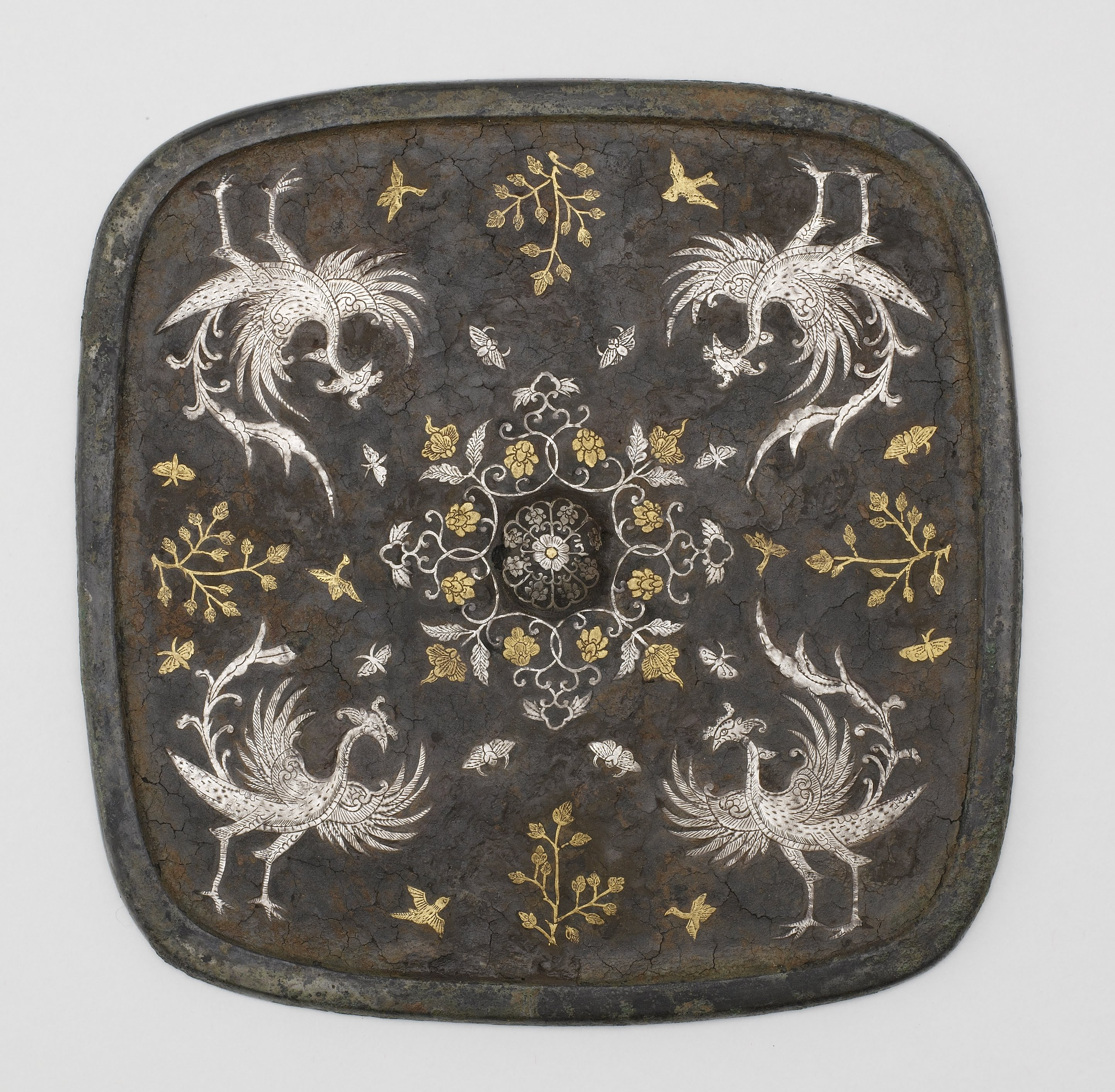
A square bronze mirror with a phoenix motif of gold and silver inlaid with lacquer, 8th century

Technology during the Tang period was built also upon the precedents of the past. Previous advancements in clockworks and timekeeping included the mechanical gear systems of Zhang Heng (78–139) and Ma Jun (fl. 3rd century), which gave the Tang mathematician, mechanical engineer, astronomer, and monk Yi Xing (683–727) inspiration when he invented the world's first clockwork escapement mechanism in 725. This was used alongside a water clock and waterwheel to power a rotating armillary sphere in representation of astronomical observation. Yi Xing's device also had a mechanically timed bell that was struck automatically every hour, and a drum that was struck automatically every quarter-hour; essentially, a striking clock. Yi Xing's astronomical clock and water-powered armillary sphere became well known throughout the country, since students attempting to pass the imperial examinations by 730 had to write an essay on the device as an exam requirement. However, the most common type of public and palace timekeeping device was the inflow clepsydra. Its design was improved c. 610 by the Sui dynasty engineers Geng Xun and Yuwen Kai. They provided a steelyard balance that allowed seasonal adjustment in the pressure head of the compensating tank and could then control the rate of flow for different lengths of day and night.

There were many other mechanical inventions during the Tang era. These included a 0.9 m (2 ft 11 in) tall mechanical wine server created during the early 8th century in the shape of an artificial mountain, carved out of iron and rested on a lacquered-wooden tortoise frame. This intricate device used a hydraulic pump that siphoned wine out of metal dragon-headed faucets, as well as tilting bowls that were timed to dip wine down, by force of gravity when filled, into an artificial lake that had intricate iron leaves popping up as trays for placing party treats. Furthermore, as the historian Charles Benn describes it:

Midway up the southern side of the mountain was a dragon ... the beast opened its mouth and spit brew into a goblet seated on a large [iron] lotus leaf beneath. When the cup was 80% full, the dragon ceased spewing ale, and a guest immediately seized the goblet. If he was slow in draining the cup and returning it to the leaf, the door of a pavilion at the top of the mountain opened and a mechanical wine server, dressed in a cap and gown, emerged with a wooden bat in his hand. As soon as the guest returned the goblet, the dragon refilled it, the wine server withdrew, and the doors of the pavilion closed ... A pump siphoned the ale that flowed into the ale pool through a hidden hole and returned the brew to the reservoir [holding more than 16 quarts/15 litres of wine] inside the mountain.

Yet the use of a teasing mechanical puppet in this wine-serving device was not exactly a novel invention of the Tang, since the use of mechanical puppets in China date to the Qin dynasty (221–206 BC). In the 3rd century Ma Jun had an entire mechanical puppet theatre operated by the rotation of a waterwheel. There are many stories of automatons used in the Tang, including general Yang Wulian's wooden statue of a monk who stretched his hands out to collect contributions; when the number of coins reached a certain weight, the mechanical figure moved his arms to deposit them in a satchel. This weight-and-lever mechanism was exactly like Heron's penny slot machine. Other devices included one by Wang Ju, whose "wooden otter" could allegedly catch fish; Needham suspects a spring trap of some kind was employed here.

In the realm of structural engineering and technical Chinese architecture, there were also government standard building codes, outlined in the early Tang building code Yingshan Ling. Fragments of this book have survived in the Tang Lü (Tang Code), while the Song dynasty architectural manual of the Yingzao Fashi by Li Jie (1065–1101) in 1103 is the oldest existing technical treatise on Chinese architecture that has survived in full. During the reign of Emperor Xuanzong (712–756), there were 34,850 registered craftsmen serving the state, managed by an agency for palace buildings.

=== Woodblock printing ===
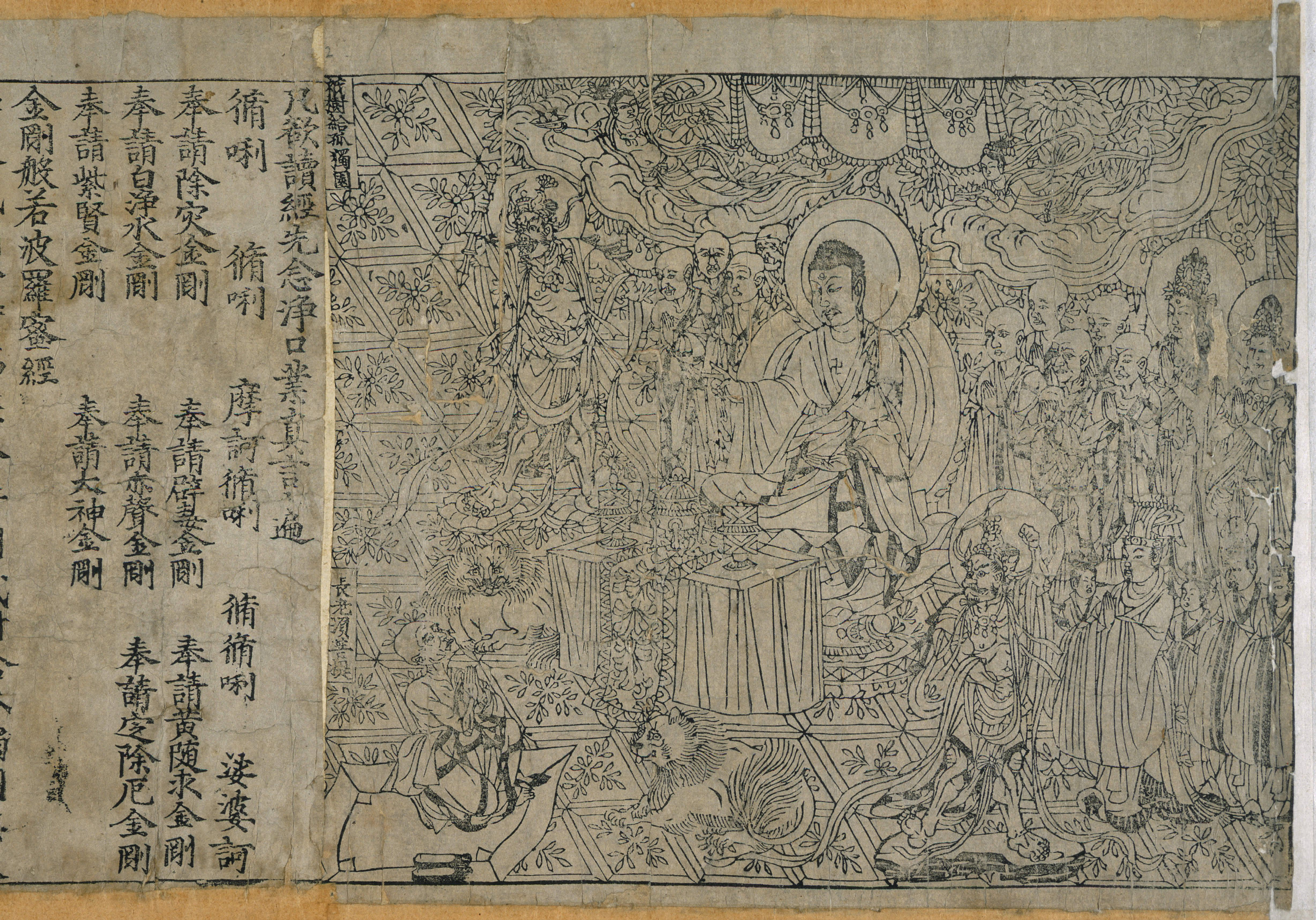
The Diamond Sutra (868) is the world's first widely printed book to include a specific date of printing

Woodblock printing made the written word available to vastly greater audiences. One of the world's oldest surviving printed documents is a miniature Buddhist dharani sutra unearthed at Xi'an in 1974, and dated roughly from 650 to 670. The Diamond Sutra is the first full-length book printed at regular size, complete with illustrations embedded with the text and precisely dated to 868. Among the earliest documents to be printed were Buddhist texts as well as calendars, the latter essential for calculating and marking which days were auspicious and which days were not. With so many books coming into circulation for the general public, literacy rates could improve, along with the lower classes being able to obtain cheaper sources of study. Therefore, there were more lower-class people seen entering the Imperial Examinations and passing them by the later Song dynasty. Although the later Bi Sheng's movable type printing in the 11th century was innovative for his period, woodblock printing that became widespread in the Tang remained the dominant method of printing in China until the more advanced printing press from Europe became widely accepted and used in East Asia. The first use of the playing card during the Tang dynasty was an auxiliary invention of the new age of printing.

=== Cartography ===
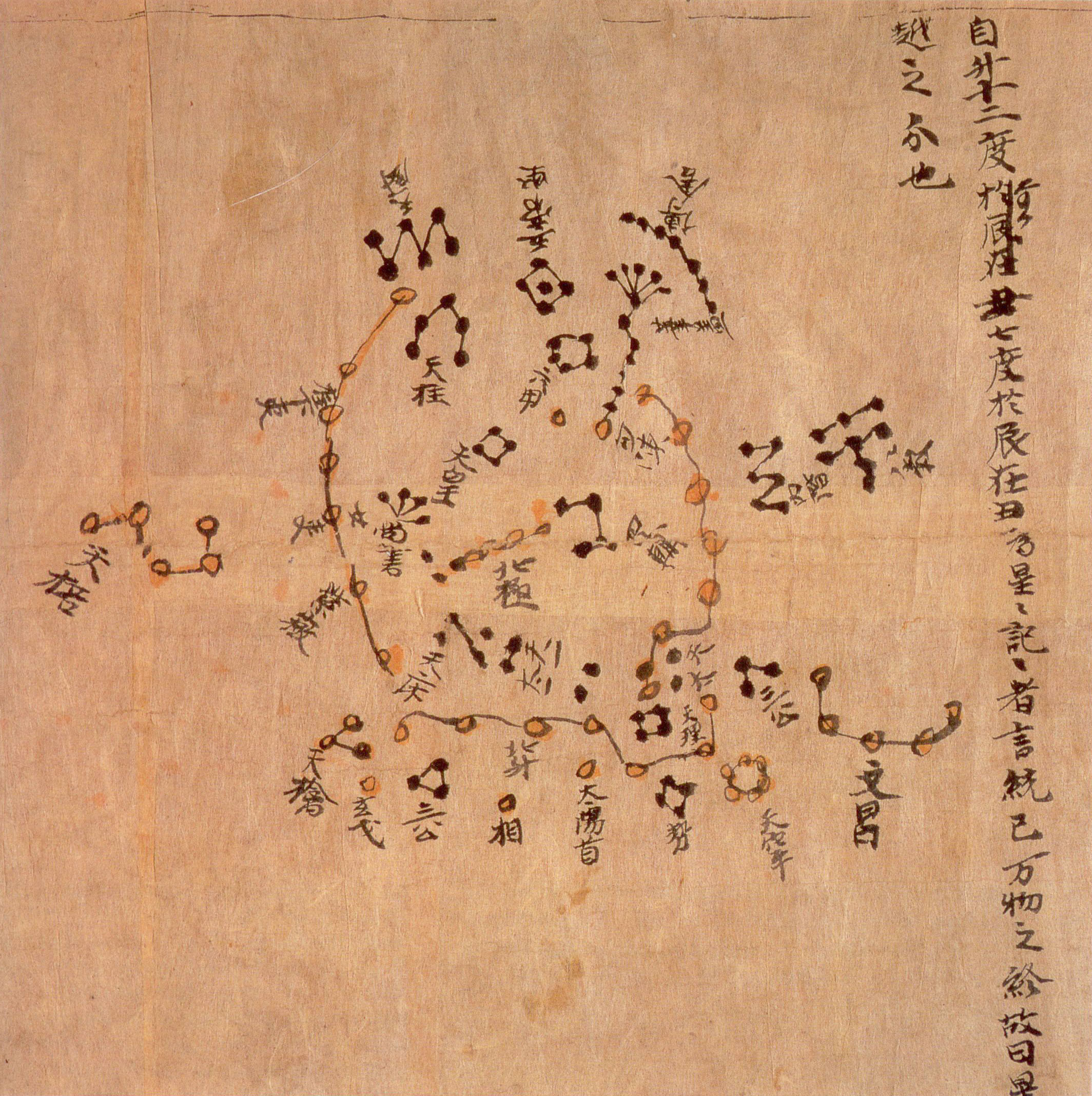
The Dunhuang map, a star map dated c. 700 depicting the north polar region; the map belongs to a set cataloguing a total of over 1,300 stars

In cartography, the Tang made further advances beyond the standards of the Han. When the Tang chancellor Pei Ju (547–627) was working for the Sui dynasty as a Commercial Commissioner in 605, he created a well-known gridded map with a graduated scale in the tradition of Pei Xiu (224–271). The Tang chancellor Xu Jingzong (592–672) was also known for his map of China drawn in 658. In 785, the Emperor Dezong had the geographer and cartographer Jia Dan (730–805) complete a map of China and her former colonies in Central Asia. Upon its completion in 801, the map was 9.1 m (30 ft) in length and 10 m (33 ft) in height, mapped out on a grid scale of one inch equalling one hundred li. A Chinese map of 1137 is similar in complexity to the one made by Jia Dan, carved on a stone stele with a grid scale of 100 li. The only Tang-era maps that have survived are star charts, despite the earliest extant terrain maps of China from the earlier state of Qin.

=== Medicine ===
The Chinese of the Tang era were interested in the benefits of officially classifying the medicines used in pharmacology. In 657, Emperor Gaozong of Tang (r. 649–683) commissioned an official materia medica, complete with text and illustrated drawings for 833 different medicinal substances. In addition to compiling pharmacopeias, the Tang fostered learning in medicine by upholding imperial medical colleges, state examinations for doctors, and publishing forensic manuals for physicians. Authors of medicine in the Tang include Zhen Chuan (d. 643) and Sun Simiao (581–682); the former was the first to identify in writing that patients with diabetes had an excess of sugar in their urine, and the latter was the first to recognise that diabetic patients should avoid consuming alcohol and starchy foods. As written by Zhen Chuan and others in the Tang, the thyroid glands of sheep and pigs were successfully used to treat goitres; thyroid extracts were not used to treat patients with goitre in the West until 1890. The use of the dental amalgam, manufactured from tin and silver, was first introduced in the medical text Xinxiu bencao written by Su Gong in 659.

=== Alchemy, gas cylinders, and air conditioning ===
Chinese scientists of the Tang period employed complex chemical formulas for an array of different purposes, often found through experiments of alchemy. These included a waterproof and dust-repelling cream or varnish for clothes and weapons, fireproof cement for glass and porcelain wares, a waterproof cream applied to silk clothes of underwater divers, a cream designated for polishing bronze mirrors, and many other useful formulas. Porcelain was invented in China during the Tang, although many types of glazed ceramics preceded it.

Since the time of the Han, the Chinese had drilled deep boreholes to transport natural gas from bamboo pipelines to stoves where cast iron evaporation pans boiled brine to extract salt. During the Tang dynasty, a gazetteer of Sichuan province stated that at one of these 182 m (597 ft) 'fire wells', men collected natural gas into portable bamboo tubes which could be carried around for dozens of kilometres and still produce a flame. These were essentially the first gas cylinders; Robert Temple assumes some sort of tap was used for this device.

The inventor Ding Huan (fl. 180) of the Han dynasty invented a rotary fan for air conditioning. In 747, Emperor Xuanzong had a "Cool Hall" built in the imperial palace, which Tang Yulin described as having water-powered fan wheels for air conditioning as well as rising jet streams of water from fountains. During the subsequent Song dynasty, written sources mentioned the rotary fan as even more widely used.

== Historiography ==
The first classic work about the Tang is the Old Book of Tang by Liu Xu et al. of the Later Jin. This was edited into another history (labeled the New Book of Tang) by the Song historians Ouyang Xiu, Song Qi, et al. Both were based on earlier annals, now lost. Both of them also rank among the Twenty-Four Histories of China. One of the surviving sources of the Old Book of Tang, primarily covering up to 756, is the Tongdian, which Du You presented to the emperor in 801. The Tang period was placed into the enormous 294-volume universal history text of the Zizhi Tongjian, edited, compiled, and completed in 1084 by a team of scholars under the Song dynasty Chancellor Sima Guang. This historical text covered the history of China from the beginning of the Warring States in 403 BC until the beginning of the Song dynasty in 960.

== Notes ==
Preceded by Sui dynasty	Dynasties in Chinese history 618–690, 705–907	Succeeded by Five Dynasties and Ten Kingdoms
