= 1250s =

Decade

The 1250s decade ran from January 1, 1250, to December 31, 1259.

== Events ==
=== 1250 ===
==== By place ====
====== World ======
- The world population is estimated at between 400 and 416 million individuals.
- World climate transitions from the Medieval Warm Period to the Little Ice Age.

====== Europe ======
- February 2 – King Erik Eriksson of Sweden dies. The ten-year-old Valdemar, the eldest son of Birger Jarl, is elected King of Sweden, and becomes the first king from the House of Bjälbo.
- October 12 – A great storm shifts the mouth of the River Rother in England 12 miles (20 km) to the west; a battering series of strong storms significantly alters other coastal geography around Romney Marsh.
- December 13 – Emperor Frederick II dies, beginning the 23-year-long "Great Interregnum". Frederick is the last Holy Roman Emperor of the Hohenstaufen dynasty; after the interregnum, the empire passes to the Habsburgs.
- The Lombard League dissolves upon the death of its member states' nemesis, Frederick II, Holy Roman Emperor.
- King Afonso III (the Boulonnais) captures the Algarve from the Moors, thus completing the expulsion of the Moors from Portugal.
- Albertus Magnus isolates the element arsenic, as the 8th discovered metal. He also first uses the word "oriole" to describe a type of bird (most likely the golden oriole).
- The Rialto Bridge in Venice (in modern-day Italy) is converted from a pontoon bridge to a permanent, raised wooden structure.
- The Ponts Couverts fortified bridges of Strasbourg (in modern-day France) are completed.
- Vincent of Beauvais completes his proto-encyclopedic work Speculum Maius ("Greater mirror").
- The first of the Parlements of Ancien Régime France is established.
- Villard de Honnecourt draws the first known image of a sawmill.
- The first usage is made of the English word "cuckold", according to the Oxford English Dictionary.
- Medieval music: The Notre Dame school of polyphony ends.

====== Asia ======
- July 9 – The Qaymariyya tribe engineers a coup d'état to hand over Damascus to An-Nasir Yusuf. The garrison in the citadel surrenders later to him.
- A kurultai is called by Batu Khan in Siberia as part of maneuverings which will elect Möngke Khan as khan of the Mongol Empire in 1251.
- Starting in this year and ending in 1275, the Muslim Shougeng Pu, likely a Persian or an Arab, serves as the Commissioner of Merchant Shipping for the Song dynasty Chinese seaport at Quanzhou, due to his effort in defeating pirates.

====== Africa ======
- April 8 – Battle of Fariskur: Louis IX (the Saint) is captured by Baibars' Mamluk army while he is in Egypt conducting the Seventh Crusade; he later has to ransom himself.
- April 30 – King Louis IX (the Saint) is released by his Egyptian captors after paying a ransom of one million dinars and turning over the city of Damietta.
- May 2 – Al-Muazzam Turanshah, Ayyubid ruler of Egypt, is murdered, ending effective Ayyubid Dynasty rule in the country. He is briefly succeeded by his widow, Sultana Shajar al-Durr.
- July 21 – Aybak becomes ruler of Egypt, beginning the Bahri Dynasty of the Mamluk Sultanate. After 5 days he stands down and the six-year-old Al-Ashraf Musa is nominally proclaimed sultan.
- The Welayta state is founded in modern-day Ethiopia.
- In Tunis, a popular rebellion against newly arrived, wealthy and influential Andalusian refugees breaks out, and is violently put down.
- The Hafsid caliph al-Mustansir enforces laws of ghiyar, or differentiation for non-Muslims. As such, Jews have to wear a distinguishing badge (shikla) which Tunisian Jews will have to wear into the nineteenth century.

====== Oceania ======
- Samoa frees itself from Tongan rule, which begins the Malietoa dynasty in Samoa (approximate date).

==== By topic ====
====== Markets ======
- The Flemish town of Douai emits the first recorded redeemable annuities in medieval Europe, confirming a trend of consolidation of local public debt started in 1218, in Rheims.
- The Sienese bankers belonging to the firm known as the Gran Tavola, under the steering of the Bonsignori Brothers, become the main financiers of the Papacy.

=== 1251 ===
==== By place ====
====== Europe ======
- April – The first Shepherds' Crusade, a domestic French uprising in response to events in Egypt during the Seventh Crusade, occurs.
- May – English governor Simon de Montfort suppresses a revolt in Gascony.
- December 26 – King Alexander III of Scotland marries Margaret, daughter of King Henry III of England, precipitating a power struggle between the two monarchs.
- Andrew de Longjumeau, dispatched two years earlier by King Louis IX of France as an ambassador to the Mongols, meets the king in Palestine, with reports from the Mongols and Tartary; his mission is considered a failure.
- Mindaugas of Lithuania is baptized, in prelude to his crowning as King of Lithuania in 1253.
- Alexander Nevsky signs the first peace treaty between Kievan Rus' and Norway.
- King Conrad IV of Germany invades Italy, but fails to subdue the supporters of Pope Innocent IV.
- Ottokar II of Bohemia, later to become King of Bohemia, is elected Duke of Austria.
- The earliest known manuscript of The Proverbs of Alfred, a collection of sayings of England's Alfred the Great, is written.

====== Asia ======
- April 21 – City of Launggyet in Arakan (modern-day Burma) is founded according to some sources.
- July 1 – Möngke Khan is elected as the fourth great Khan of the Mongol Empire.
- The carving of the Tripitaka Koreana, a collection of Buddhist scriptures recorded on some 81,000 wooden blocks, is completed.

=== 1252 ===
==== By place ====
====== Europe ======
- April 6 – Saint Peter of Verona is assassinated by Carino of Balsamo.
- May 15 – Pope Innocent IV issues the papal bull Ad exstirpanda, which authorizes the torture of heretics in the Medieval Inquisition. Torture quickly gains widespread usage across Catholic Europe.
- June 1 – Alfonso X is proclaimed king of Castile and León.
- July – The settlement of Stockholm in Sweden is founded, by Birger Jarl.
- December 25 – Christopher I of Denmark is crowned King of Denmark, in the Lund Cathedral.
- The Polish land of Lebus is incorporated into the German state of Brandenburg, marking the start of Brandenburg's expansion into previously Polish areas (Neumark).
- The Lithuanian city of Klaipėda (Memel) is founded by the Teutonic Knights.
- The town and monastery of Orval Abbey in Belgium burn to the ground; rebuilding takes 100 years.
- Thomas Aquinas travels to the University of Paris, to begin his studies there for a master's degree.
- In astronomy, work begins on the recording of the Alfonsine tables.

====== Asia ======
- The classic Japanese text Jikkunsho is completed.
- The Chinese era Chunyou ends.
- The Mongols take the westernmost province of the Song dynasty empire.

=== 1253 ===
==== By place ====
====== Europe ======
- January 18 – King Henry I of Cyprus ("the Fat") dies and is succeeded by his son Hugh II, who is only a few months old. His mother, Queen Plaisance of Antioch, claims the regency of Cyprus and the titular regency of Jerusalem. The High Court of Cyprus confirms her position, but the barons of Outremer require her attendance in person before they will recognize her. John of Ibelin, count of Jaffa, remains as bailli, and Plaisance contemplates marrying John's youthful son Balian. Meanwhile, King Louis IX of France ("the Saint"), still staying at Acre, continues to administer the government.
- Summer – The Kingdom of Galicia–Volhynia becomes a vassal state to the expanding Mongol Empire. Prince Daniel of Galicia is crowned "Rex Rusiae" and becomes officially an Orthodox subject of the Papal States.
- July 4 – William II, count of Holland, defeats the Flemish forces under Guy of Dampierre at Westkapelle. He forced him and his mother, Margaret II, to respect the division of Flanders and Hainaut.
- July 6 – Mindaugas and his wife Morta are crowned as king and queen of Lithuania, ruling between 300,000 and 400,000 subjects.
- October 10 – German imperial forces under King Conrad IV suppress the Sicilian rebellion and recapture Naples.

====== England ======
- August 6 – King Henry III leads an expedition to Gascony, to repel a rumoured invasion from Castile. Meanwhile, Simon de Montfort returns from Gascony where he allies himself with the barons who oppose Henry.
- Henry III meets with the nobles and church leaders to reaffirm the validity of Magna Carta in exchange for taxation.

====== Levant ======
- April – An-Nasir Yusuf, Ayyubid ruler of Damascus, cedes Palestine, together with Jerusalem, Nablus and the coastline of Al-Sham to Aybak, Mamluk sultan of Egypt.

====== Asia ======
- April 28 – Nichiren, Japanese Buddhist monk, declares his intent to preach the Lotus Sutra and Namu Myōhō Renge Kyō as the true Buddhism, thus founding Nichiren Buddhism.
- May – Louis IX of France ("the Saint") dispatches William of Rubruck from Constantinople on a missionary journey to Karakorum to seek an alliance against Syrian and Egyptian Muslims.
- Mongol forces under Hulagu Khan begin a campaign against the Nizari Ismaili State. An advance guard (12,000 men) under Kitbuqa captures several fortresses in Quhistan.
- Mongol forces under Kublai Khan conquer the Dali Kingdom (modern-day Yunnan). The population migrates to Siam (modern Thailand).
- Kublai Khan introduces the baisha xiyue song and dance suite to the music of Yunnan.

==== By topic ====
====== Literature ======
- Matthew Paris, English Benedictine chronicler, completes the major part of his Chronica Majora, a chronicle of English history.

====== Religion ======
- October – Pope Innocent IV returns to Rome, after being deposed for 9 years by former Emperor Frederick II, whose clash forms an important chapter in the conflict between the Papal States and the Holy Roman Empire.
- Innocent IV offers the crown of Sicily, which he controls, to Richard of Cornwall and Charles of Anjou, both of whom refuse, and later to the 8-year-old Edmund, son of Henry III of England.
- The upper Basilica of Saint Francis of Assisi, the earliest important structure of Italian Gothic architecture, is completed in Assisi.
- Sligo Abbey, a Dominican monastery, is founded by Maurice FitzGerald, Norman chief governor of Ireland.

=== 1254 ===
==== By place ====
====== Byzantine Empire ======
- Battle of Adrianople: Byzantine forces under Emperor Theodore II Laskaris defeat the invading Bulgarians near Edirne (Adrianople). The young and inexperienced Tsar Michael II Asen is caught by surprise and the Bulgarians suffer heavy losses. Michael is wounded during his hasty retreat through the forest.

====== Europe ======
- May 21 – King Conrad IV, son of the late Emperor Frederick II, dies of malaria at Lavello (southern Italy). With Conrad's death a interregnum begins, during which no ruler manages to gain undisputed control of Germany. The 22-year-old Manfred, half-brother of Conrad, refuses to surrender Sicily to Pope Innocent IV and accepts the regency on behalf of Conrad's 2-year-old son Conradin ("the Younger").
- November 2 – German forces under Manfred start an anti-papal revolt against Innocent IV and seize Lucera in the Tavoliere Plains. He defeats the papal army at Foggia and gains the loyalty of Apulia, on December 2.
- King Afonso III of Portugal ("the Boulonnais") holds the first session of the Cortes (Portugal's general assembly composed of nobles, members of the middle class and representatives from all municipalities), in Leiria.
- William II, anti-king of Germany, holds a diet (princely convention) at Worms, in which the German cities are represented for the first time. He givee orders to build strong castles in Heemskerk and Haarlem.
- Doge Reniero Zeno sends the Horses of Saint Mark, looted from Constantinople during the Fourth Crusade, to Venice, where they are installed on the terrace of the façade of St. Mark's Basilica.

====== England ======
- King Henry III of England grants his eldest son the Lord Edward areas of land including crown lands in Wales, Ireland, the Channel Islands and Gascony. He is also given the cities of Bristol, Stamford and Grantham. The reason for these concessions is to give Edward experience of governing lands of his own before becoming a king. Edward is granted the Three Castles in Wales, Skenfrith Castle, White Castle and Grosmont Castle.
- Summer – The Lord Edward travels from Portsmouth with his mother, Queen Eleanor of Provence, and Boniface of Savoy, archbishop of Canterbury, to marry the 13-year-old Eleanor of Castile, the half-sister of King Alfonso X of Castile. Henry III has demanded the marriage in exchange for ending the war with Alfonso. In August, the party arrives in Burgos, capital of Castile, where the marriage is due to take place.
- November 1 – Edward marries Eleanor of Castile in the Cistercian monastery of Las Huelgas at Burgos.

====== Levant ======
- February 21 – King Louis IX of France ("the Saint") signs a multi-year truce with An-Nasir Yusuf, Ayyubid ruler of Damascus, who is well aware of a Mongol threat and has no wish for war with the Crusader States.
- April 24 – Louis IX and his family sail from Acre to France. His boat is nearly wrecked off the coast of Cyprus and later nearly destroyed by fire. In July, the royal party arrives at Hyères in Provence.

====== Asia ======
- January 4 – William of Rubruck, Flemish missionary and explorer, is received courteously with an embassy at Karakorum. He is given an audience with Möngke Khan, who is loaded with gifts and letters from Louis IX.

==== By topic ====
====== Cities and Towns ======
- June 12 – The Dutch city of Alkmaar obtains city rights from William II, anti-king of Germany.
- The Danish city of Copenhagen receives its city charter from Bishop Jacob Erlandsen.

====== Commerce ======
- The Rhenish League, a confederation of trading cities, is established in the Rhineland, Western Germany. The league (or Städtebund) comprises 59 cities.

====== Literature ======
- The Japanese classic text Kokon Chomonjū is completed during the Kamakura Period under the reign of the 11-year-old Emperor Go-Fukakusa.

====== Markets ======
- As part of an offensive against usury in north-western Europe, Innocent IV relieves the city of Beauvais from its obligations to its creditors.

====== Religion ======
- March (possible date) – The existence and name of purgatory is acknowledged by the Catholic Church.
- December 7 – Innocent IV dies after a pontificate of 11 years. He is succeeded by Alexander IV as the 181st pope of the Catholic Church.
- The construction of the Cathedral of Saint Martin is initiated by Henry I van Vianden, bishop of Utrecht.

=== 1255 ===
==== By place ====
====== Europe ======
- February 25 – Battle of Montebruno: Guelph forces under Thomas II of Savoy invade the Ghibelline territory of Asti (located in the Piedmont region), but he is defeated by the Astigiani army, led by William VII, at Garzigliana (Northern Italy). Thomas retreats and takes refuge in Turin; however, he is later captured by the Ghibellines.
- May – William of Rubruck from Constantinople returns to Cyprus from his missionary journey to convert the Mongols of central and eastern Asia; his efforts have been unsuccessful.
- Emperor Theodore II Laskaris, who is in exile in the Empire of Nicaea, conducts a military campaign to recover Thrace from the Bulgarians.
- King Afonso III of Portugal ("the Boulonnais") moves his residence and royal court from Lisbon to Coimbra, which becomes the capital of Portugal.
- The Teutonic Knights in Prussia found Königsberg (modern-day Kaliningrad) and name it in honour of King Ottokar II of Bohemia.
- The lands of the House of Nassau are divided between the brothers Walram II and Otto I, not to be reunited until 1806.

====== England ======
- June – Battle of Bryn Derwin: Llywelyn ap Gruffudd defeats his two brothers Dafydd ap Gruffydd and Owain Goch ap Gruffydd, to become sole ruler of northern Wales. Dafydd and Owain are both imprisoned.
- August – Following the death of Little Saint Hugh, in an instance of blood libel, eighteen Jews of Lincoln, are tortured and executed by royal command on suspicion of being involved in the boy's murder.
- A survey of royal privileges is conducted, which is included in the Hundred Rolls, a census seen as a follow-up to the Domesday Book (completed in 1086). The Hundred Rolls is later completed with two larger surveys, in 1274/75 and 1279/80.

==== By topic ====
====== Art and Culture ======
- The Gothic cathedral at Bourges in central France, is completed (it will become a UNESCO World Heritage Site).

====== City and Towns ======
- The town of Banská Bystrica (located in central Slovakia) is granted municipal privileges by King Béla IV of Hungary.

====== Market ======
- Orlando Bonsignori, an Italian minor merchant, forms a consortium called the Gran Tavola ("Great Table"), which becomes the most powerful bank in western Europe. He becomes the exclusive banker for the deposits of the income of the Papal States.

=== 1256 ===
==== By place ====
====== Mongol Empire ======
- Spring – Mongol forces (some 80,000 men), under Hulagu Khan, cross the Oxus River, and begin their campaign to destroy the remaining Muslim states in southwestern Asia – with the first objectives being the Nizari Ismaili strongholds and Baghdad, the capital of the Abbasid Caliphate. The roads across Turkestan and Persia are repaired, and bridges built. Carts are requisitioned to bring siege machines from China.
- October – Mongol forces led by Baiju Noyan (operating under Hulagu Khan's command) win a victory over Kaykaus II, Seljuk ruler of the Sultanate of Rum, and capture Anatolia. Kaykaus flees to the Byzantine court where he seeks refuge at Constantinople. The Empire of Trebizond fearing a potential punitive Mongol expedition, becomes a vassal state and is forced to pay a tribute tax every year in gold and silk.
- November 8–23 – Siege of Maymun-Diz: Mongol forces under Hulagu Khan successfully besiege the mountain castle of Maymun-Diz. Hulagu encircles the fortress and begins a bombardment for three days by mangonels from a nearby hilltop. On November 19, Nizari Isma'ili imam Rukn al-Din Khurshah surrenders, but a small part of the garrison refuses and fights a last stand, until they are killed after three days.
- December 15 – Mongol forces under Hulagu Khan capture and dismantle Alamut Castle (near the Masoudabad region) after the surrender of the Nizari Ismaili leaders. Hulagu founds the Ilkhanate dynasty of Persia, which becomes one of the four main divisions of the Mongol Empire. The Nizari Ismaili government is disestablished, some of them migrate to Afghanistan, Badakhshan and Sindh (modern Pakistan).

====== Europe ======
- War of the Euboeote Succession: Achaean forces under William II of Villehardouin attempt to gain control of the island of Euboea, which is resisted by the local Lombard barons (or "triarchs") with the aid of the Republic of Venice. William launches devastating raids in Euboea. Guy I de la Roche, the "Great Lord" of Athens and Thebes, enters the war against William, along with other barons of Central Greece.
- 30 July – The Venetian Marsilio Zorzi recaptures Curzola in Dalmatia, and re-establishes himself as Count of Curzola and Mèleda.

====== British Isles ======
- Prince Llywelyn ap Gruffudd invades the northern coastal areas of Wales that agreed to English rule in 1254. The Lord Edward, who has been given the areas to govern himself by his father, King Henry III of England, asks him for support but Henry refuses.
- The ancient Irish Kingdom of Breifne splits into East Breifne and West Breifne, after a war between the O'Reillys and the O'Rourkes.

====== Levant ======
- Venetian–Genoese Wars: A dispute between Venice and Genoa arises about concerning land in Acre owned by Mar Saba but claimed by both Venice and Genoa – which leads to a Genoese attack of the monastery in the Venetian quarter. The Venetians are supported by Pisa and the Knights Templar, while the Genoese are joined by the Knights Hospitaller.

==== By topic ====
====== Natural Disaster ======
- June 30 – A large volcanic eruption in Harrat Rahat (near Medina) is associated with an Islamic prophecy.

====== Religion ======
- May 4 – Pope Alexander IV issues the papal bull Licet ecclesiae catholicae, constituting the Order of Saint Augustine at Lecceto Monastery.
- August 25 – In Bologna, slavery and serfdom are abolished; this event is recorded in the document called Liber Paradisus (or Heaven Book).

=== 1257 ===
==== By place ====
====== Europe ======
- January 13 – At the first recorded meeting of the college of the seven Electors of the Holy Roman Empire, the 48-year-old Richard of Cornwall (the brother of King Henry III of England) is elected King of the Romans. He is crowned at Aachen, on May 17. His candidacy is opposed by King Alfonso X of Castile ("the Wise"), Pope Alexander IV and King Louis IX of France ("the Saint") who favour Alfonso, but both are ultimately convinced by Richard's sister-in-law, Queen Eleanor of Provence, to support Richard.
- Spring – The Epirote–Nicaean conflict (1257–59) begins between the Despotate of Epirus and the Empire of Nicaea. Despot Michael II Komnenos Doukas revolts and defeats the Nicaean army under George Akropolites. The Epirote and Serbian forces join their attacks against Michael, who sends his forces into Macedonia and marches on to Thessalonica. In response, Michael is attacked – on the west coast of Epirus – by Manfred of Sicily. Manfred first occupies the major Ionian Islands, including Corfu. Then he lands on the Albanian coast and takes Durazzo, Berat, Valona and their environs.
- The pagan Karelians start a destructive expedition to Sweden in which King Valdemar requests Alexander IV to declare a crusade against them. This leads to the Third Swedish Crusade to Finland (1293–95).

====== British Isles ======
- Battle of Cadfan: An English expeditionary army under Stephen Bauzan is ambushed and defeated by Welsh forces. The English are decimated by devastating guerilla attacks and the Welsh capture the English supply train. Stephen Bauzan is killed along with some 1,000–3,000 of his men. The remaining English flee the battle, Prince Llywelyn ap Gruffudd is said to have been present at the battle, collecting spoils from the fallen English army. According to sources, it is one of the greatest victories of a Welsh army in the field against a much more powerful English force.
- King Henry III of England relents to the demands of his son The Lord Edward for assistance to fight the Welsh, originally made in 1256). He joins him on a campaign to retake the territories lost to the Welsh forces led by Llywelyn ap Gruffudd.
- Henry III of England orders the production of a pure gold penny coin with a value of twenty pence. Unfortunately, the bullion value of the coins is about 20% higher than the nominal face value, leading to poor circulation, as coins are melted down by individuals for their gold content.
- Battle of Creadran Cille: Norman invading forces under Maurice FitzGerald are driven out by Gofraid O'Donnell in northern Connacht (Ireland). On May 20, FitzGerald is killed in personal combat by O'Donnell.

====== Levant ======
- Venetian–Genoese Wars: The Venetian fleet under Admiral Lorenzo Tiepolo breaks through the harbour chain at Acre and destroys several Genoese ships. He also attacks the fortifications but Tiepolo is unable to expel the Genoese garrison (some 800 men strong and armed with 50–60 ballistae), from their quarter of the city throwing up a blockade.
- April 10 – Izz al-Din Aybak, Mamluk sultan of Egypt, is murdered on orders of his wife, Shajar al-Durr. He is succeeded by his 14-year-old son, Nur al-Din Ali, as ruler of the Mamluk Sultanate (until 1259).

====== Mongol Empire ======
- Spring – Mongol forces under Uriyangkhadai conduct a campaign against local Yi and Lolo tribes in Vietnam. He returns to Gansu and sends messengers to the court of Möngke Khan informing him that Yunnan is firmly under Mongolian control. Möngke Khan honors and rewards Uriyangkhadai for his military achievements.
- Winter – Mongol forces move down from their base at Hamadan, while Baiju Noyan crosses the river Tigris at Mosul with his army. On the left-wing Kitbuqa enters the plain of Iraq, while Mongol forces under Hulagu Khan advance through Kermanshah.

====== Asia ======
- March – The Japanese Kōgen era ends and the Shōka begins during the reign of the 14-year-old Emperor Go-Fukakusa (until 1259).

==== By topic ====
====== City and Towns ======
- June 5 – The city of Kraków is granted Magdeburg rights by High Duke Bolesław V the Chaste, having been rebuilt after being nearly destroyed during the First Mongol invasion of Poland.

====== Education ======
- Louis IX of France ("the Saint") confirms the foundation by his chaplain Robert de Sorbon of the College of Sorbonne in Paris, giving a formal college (and still-common name) to the already existing University of Paris.

====== Literature ======
- Matthew Paris, English monk and chronicler, personally interviews Henry III for an entire week while compiling his major work of English history, Chronica Majora.

====== Natural Disaster ======
- Samalas eruption: Mount Samalas volcano erupts on Lombok Island, Indonesia. One of the largest volcanic eruptions in the past 10,000 years, it creates severe climatic changes across the globe, leading to severe famine and death, and to one of the biggest geopolitical changes across the globe over the next few centuries.

=== 1258 ===
==== By place ====
====== Mongol Empire ======
- February 10 – Siege of Baghdad: Mongol forces (some 150,000 men), led by Hulagu Khan, besiege and conquer Baghdad after a siege of 13 days. During the first week of February, the eastern walls begin to collapse, and the Mongols swarm into the city, on February 10. Caliph Al-Musta'sim surrenders himself to Hulagu – together with all the Abbasid chief officers and officials. They are ordered to lay down their arms, and are massacred. Hulagu imprisons Al-Musta'sim among his treasures, to starve him to death. Meanwhile, massacres continue throughout the whole city; in 40 days about 80,000 citizens are murdered. The only survivors are the ones who are hiding in cellars which are not discovered, and a number of attractive girls and boys who are kept to be slaves, and the Christian community, who take refuge in the churches which are left undisturbed, by the special orders of Hulagu's wife, Doquz Khatun.
- February 15 – Hulagu Khan enters Baghdad, where many quarters of the city are ruined by fire. The House of Wisdom (or Great Library) is destroyed, numerous precious book collections are thrown into the Tigris River. Before the siege, about 400,000 manuscripts are rescued by Nasir al-Din al-Tusi, Persian polymath and theologian, who takes them to Maragheh observatory (located in East Azerbaijan Province). The sack of Baghdad brings an end to the Abbasid Caliphate (750–1258) and the Islamic Golden Age. Many professors, physicians, scientists, clerics, artists and lecturers are also massacred.

====== Europe ======
- May 11 – Treaty of Corbeil: King Louis IX of France ("the Saint") signs a peace treaty with King James I of Aragon ("the Conqueror"). Louis, heir of Charlemagne, formally renounces his feudal overlordship over Catalonia (independent de facto since 988), while James renounces his claims over Occitania.
- June – War of the Euboeote Succession: Achaean forces under William II Villehardouin defeat a coalition of Greek princes led by Guy I de la Roche ("Great Lord"), duke of Athens, which ends the conflict, on August 6.
- August 10 – Manfred, son of the late Emperor Frederick II, is crowned king of Sicily at Palermo. Pope Alexander IV, who has an alliance with the Saracens, declares the coronation void and excommunicates Manfred.
- August 16 – Theodore II Laskaris dies after a 4-year reign at Magnesia. He is succeeded by his 7-year-old son, John IV, as ruler of the Empire of Nicaea. His regent becomes the bureaucrat George Mouzalon.
- August 25 – George Mouzalon is assassinated in Magnesia ad Sipylum, as part of a conspiracy led by Byzantine nobles, under future Emperor Michael VIII Palaiologos.
- Gissur Þorvaldsson, Icelandic chieftain (or goði), is made Earl of Iceland for his loyal service to King Haakon IV of Norway ("the Old").

====== British Isles ======
- May 2 – King Henry III of England accepts the demand of Simon de Montfort and his baronial supporters that the government is reformed with a committee of 22 barons, including the king. As an act of faith, Simon de Montfort hands over his estates at Odiham and Kenilworth as part of the proposals. The Provisions of Oxford establish baronial control of the government, also known as the Oxford Parliament, on June 11.
- Llywelyn ap Gruffudd proclaims himself Prince of Wales, first used in an agreement between Llywelyn and his supporters and the Scottish nobility. He becomes the final ruler of an independent Wales before the conquest of Wales by Edward I of England.
- Irish, assisted by Scottish gallowglasses, halt the English advance westward through Ireland.

====== Levant ======
- June 25 – Battle of Acre: The Genoese send an armada (some 50 galleys) to relieve the blockade at Acre and ask for the assistance of Philip of Montfort, lord of Tyre, and the Knights Hospitaller for a combined attack from the land side. The Genoese fleet's arrival takes the Venetians by surprise but the superior experience and seamanship result in a crushing Venetian victory, with half the Genoese ships lost. Later, the Genoese garrison is forced to abandon Acre.

====== Asia ======
- Mongol invasions of Vietnam: Mongol forces (some 30,000 men) under Uriyangkhadai, son of Subutai, invade Vietnam. After many battles, the Vietnam army is routed and defeated. The senior leaders are able to escape on pre-prepared boats, while the remnants are destroyed on the banks of the Red River. The Mongols occupy the capital city, Thăng Long (modern-day Hanoi), and massacres the city's inhabitants, by the end of January.

==== By topic ====
====== Global ======
- The consequences of the volcanic 1257 Samalas eruption in Indonesia include the following anecdotal accounts: very dry fog in France; lunar eclipses in England; severe winter in Europe; a harsh spring in Iceland; famine in England, Germany, France and Italy; and pestilence in London, parts of France, Austria, Iraq, Syria, and southeast Turkey.

====== Markets ======
- The Republic of Genoa starts imposing forced loans, known as luoghi, onto its taxpayers; they are a common resource of medieval public finance.

====== Religion ======
- September 29 – Consecration of the newly rebuilt Salisbury Cathedral in England.
- Civil unrest in northern Italy spawns the medieval musical form of Geisslerlieder, penitential songs sung by wandering bands of Flagellants.
- Kudahuvadhoo is converted to Islam.

=== 1259 ===
==== By place ====
====== Europe ======
- September – Battle of Pelagonia: The Empire of Nicaea defeats the Principality of Achaea, ensuring the eventual reconquest of Constantinople in 1261.
- December 4 – Kings Louis IX of France and Henry III of England agree to the Treaty of Paris, in which Henry renounces his claims to French-controlled territory on continental Europe (including Normandy), in exchange for Louis withdrawing his support for English rebels.
- The famous frescoes of the Boyana Church in Bulgaria are completed (the church and its murals are now a UNESCO World Heritage Site).
- The German cities of Lübeck, Wismar, and Rostock enter into a pact to defend against pirates of the Baltic Sea, laying the groundwork for the Hanseatic League.
- Nogai Khan leads the second Mongol Golden Horde attack against Lithuania, and Poland.
- Epirote–Nicaean conflict.

====== Asia ======
- August 11 – While conducting a siege against the Song dynasty city known as Fishing Town in the province of Chongqing, China, the Mongol Great Khan, Möngke Khan, dies in the nearby hills. Persian, Chinese, and Mongol records have different accounts of how he died, including succumbing to an arrow wound received by a Chinese archer in the siege, dysentery, and even a cholera epidemic. His death sparks a succession crisis in the Mongol Empire, while his brothers Ariq Böke and Kublai soon convene their own kurultai to elect themselves as the next Khan of Khans, opening the path to a four–year-long Toluid Civil War from 1260 to 1264. In the end, Ariq Böke surrenders to Kublai.
- While engaged in a war with the Mongols, the Song Chinese official Li Zengbo writes in his Kozhai Zagao, Xugaohou that the city of Qingzhou is manufacturing one to two thousand strong iron-cased gunpowder bomb shells a month, dispatching to Xiangyang and Yingzhou about ten to twenty thousand such bombs at a time.
- Lannathai, a kingdom in the north of Thailand, is founded by King Mangrai.
- The Goryeo Kingdom in Korea surrenders to invading Mongol forces.
- The Chinese era Kaiqing begins and ends, in the Northern Song dynasty of China.
- The Japanese Shōka era ends, and the Shōgen era begins.

== Significant people ==
- Möngke Khan
- Hulagu Khan
- Al-Mustasim
- Aybak
- Al-Ashraf Musa
- Louis IX of France

== Births ==
1250

- April 8 – John Tristan, son of Louis IX (d. 1270)
- Adolf II of Waldeck, prince-bishop of Liège (d. 1302)
- Agnes of Baden, German noblewoman (d. 1295)
- Albert II of Saxony, German nobleman (d. 1298)
- Albert III, German nobleman and knight (d. 1300)
- Albertus de Chiavari, Italian Master General (d. 1300)
- Allamah al-Hilli, Persian Shia theologian (d. 1325)
- Asher ben Jehiel, German Jewish rabbi (d. 1327)
- Beatrice of Savoy, Swiss noblewoman (d. 1292)
- Bonconte I da Montefeltro, Italian general (d. 1289)
- Diether of Nassau, archbishop of Trier (d. 1307)
- Dmitry of Pereslavl, Kievan Grand Prince (d. 1294)
- Esclaramunda of Foix, queen of Majorca (d. 1315)
- Fra Dolcino, Italian priest and reformist (d. 1307)
- Grigorije II of Ras, Serbian monk-scribe (d. 1321)
- Guido Cavalcanti, Italian poet and writer (d. 1300)
- Jeanne de Montfort, Swiss noblewoman (d. 1300)
- John IV (Laskaris), emperor of Nicaea (d. 1305)
- Konrad II of Masovia, Polish nobleman (d. 1294)
- Margaret of Burgundy, queen of Sicily (d. 1308)
- Matteo I Visconti, Italian imperial vicar (d. 1322)
- Mordechai ben Hillel, German scholar (d. 1298)
- Nijō Tameyo, Japanese official and poet (d. 1338)
- Niklot I, German nobleman and knight (d. 1323)
- Rhys ap Maredudd, Welsh nobleman (d. 1292)
- Robert II, French nobleman and knight (d. 1302)
- Sancho of Aragon, Spanish archbishop (d. 1275)
- Theodoric of Freiberg, German physicist (d. 1311)
- Záviš of Falkenstein, Bohemian nobleman (d. 1290)

1251

- June 5 – Hōjō Tokimune, 8th regent of the Kamakura shogunate (d. 1284)
- September 2 – Francis of Fabriano, Italian writer (d. 1322)
- Adelaide, Countess of Auxerre, French countess (d. 1290)

1252

- March 25 – Conradin, Duke of Swabia (d. 1268)
- Safi-ad-din Ardabili, Persian Sufi leader
- Eleanor de Montfort, Princess of Wales, English-born consort (d. 1282)

1253

- March 1 – Mattia de Nazarei, Italian abbess and saint (d. 1319)
- March 20 – Wareru, founder of the Martaban Kingdom (assassinated 1307)
- September 11 – Dmitry Borisovich, Kievan nobleman (d. 1294)
- October 17 – Ivo of Kermartin, Breton priest and saint (d. 1303)
- November 25 – Katherine of England, English princess (d. 1257)
- Amir Khusrau, Indian Sufi musician, poet and scholar (d. 1325)
- Anna of Greater Poland, Polish princess and abbess (d. 1295)
- Berengaria of Castile, Spanish princess and regent (d. 1300)
- Blanche of France, daughter of Louis IX ("the Saint") (d. 1323)
- Eschiva of Ibelin, Outremer noblewoman and regent (d. 1312)
- Eufemia of Greater Poland, Polish princess and nun (d. 1298)
- Everhardt I, count of Limburg and Hohenlimburg (d. 1308)
- Hugh II (de Lusignan), Cypriot ruler and regent (d. 1267)
- John II ("the One-Eyed"), count of Holstein-Kiel (d. 1321)
- Nikō, Japanese Buddhist monk and disciple (d. 1314)

1254

- March 27 – Hkun Law, Burmese ruler of Martaban (d. 1311)
- May 4 – Benvenuta Bojani, Italian nun and mystic (d. 1292)
- May 13 – Marie of Brabant, queen consort of France (d. 1322)
- June 24 – Floris V, count of Holland and Zeeland (d. 1296)
- September 15 – Marco Polo, Venetian explorer (d. 1324)
- 5 November or 6 December – Beatrice of Castile, marchioness of Montferrat (d. 1286)
- Bengt Birgersson, Swedish duke and bishop (d. 1291)
- Bonacossa Borri (or Bonaca), Italian noblewoman (d. 1321)
- Charles II of Naples ("the Lame"), son of Charles I of Anjou (d. 1309)
- Fujiwara no Tamekane, Japanese official and poet (d. 1332)
- Gerhard II, Count of Holstein-Plön ("the Blind"), German nobleman and knight (d. 1312)
- Nijō Morotada, Japanese nobleman and official (d. 1341)
- Osman I, founding ruler of the Ottoman Empire (d. 1324)
- Ren Renfa (or Ziming), Chinese artist and politician (d. 1327)
- Roger de Mowbray, English nobleman and knight (d. 1297)
- Tetsugyū Enshin, Japanese monk and scholar (d. 1326)
- Zhao Mengfu, Chinese scholar and calligrapher (d. 1322)

1255

- October 23 – Fernando de la Cerda, Spanish prince (d. 1275)
- Adolf of Nassau-Weilburg, king of Germany (d. 1298)
- Albert I of Germany, Holy Roman Emperor (d. 1308)
- Andrey of Gorodets, Kievan Grand Prince (d. 1304)
- Bogislaw IV, Polish nobleman and knight (d. 1309)
- Dino Compagni, Italian historian and writer (d. 1324)
- Francesca da Rimini, Italian noblewoman (d. 1285)
- John of Paris, French theologian and writer (d. 1306)
- Margherita Colonna, Italian nun and abbess (d. 1280)
- Nicholas I, Bohemian nobleman and knight (d. 1318)
- William Ros, Scottish nobleman and knight (d. 1316)
- Sanjar al-Jawli, Mamluk governor and ruler (d. 1345)
- Sybille of Bâgé, countess consort of Savoy (d. 1294)
- Takaoka Muneyasu, Japanese nobleman (d. 1326)

1256

- January 6 – Gertrude the Great, German mystic (d. 1302)
- January 24 – Alonso Pérez de Guzmán, Spanish nobleman (d. 1309)
- February 9 – William de Warenne, English nobleman (d. 1286)
- March 21 – Henry I, Margrave of Brandenburg ("Lackland"), German nobleman (d. 1318)
- October 23 – Möngke Temür, Mongol ruler of Shiraz (d. 1282)
- Abu Hayyan al-Gharnati, Andalusian grammarian (d. 1344)
- Adolph VI, count of Holstein-Pinneberg-Schauenburg (d. 1315)
- Ahmad al-Suhrawardi, Persian calligrapher and musician (d. 1340)
- Al-Dimashqi, Syrian geographer, explorer and writer (d. 1327)
- Andrea Dotti, Italian nobleman, preacher and saint (d. 1315)
- Ibn al-Banna, Almohad scholar and mathematician (d. 1321)
- Jamal al-Din al-Mizzi, Syrian scholar and philologist (d. 1341)
- John Segrave, English nobleman and seneschal (d. 1325)
- Padishah Khatun, Mongol female ruler and writer (d. 1295)
- Robert, Count of Clermont, French prince and nobleman (d. 1317)
- Roger Mortimer, English nobleman and constable (d. 1326)

1257

- March 24 – Yolanda of Lusignan, French noblewoman (d. 1314)
- c. June 24 – Robert de Vere, 6th Earl of Oxford, English nobleman and knight (d. 1331)
- August 15 – Muhammad III, ruler of Granada (d. 1314)
- October 14 – Przemysł II, king of Poland (d. 1296)
- Agnes of Brandenburg, queen consort of Denmark (d. 1304)
- Beatrice of Burgundy, Lady of Bourbon, French noblewoman (d. 1310)
- Frederick I, Margrave of Meissen ("the Brave"), German nobleman (d. 1323)
- Malise III, Earl of Strathearn, Scottish nobleman (d. 1312)
- Parsoma ("the Naked"), Egyptian Coptic hermit (d. 1317)
- Philip III of Falkenstein, count of Münzenberg (d. 1322)
- William Russell, English nobleman and knight (d. 1311)

1258

- Osman I, founder of the Great Ottoman Empire (d. 1324)
- March 8 – Arghun Khan, Mongol ruler of the Ilkhanate (d. 1291)
- October 10 – Joachim Piccolomini, Italian altar server (d. 1305)
- October 20 – Bolko I, Polish co-ruler (House of Piast) (d. 1313)
- December 7 – Trần Nhân Tông, Vietnamese emperor (d. 1308)
- Bertrand of Saint-Geniès, French academic lawyer and patriarch (d. 1350)
- Ferrantino Malatesta, Italian nobleman and knight (d. 1353)
- Henry I, Count of Holstein-Rendsburg, German nobleman (House of Schaumburg) (d. 1304)
- Henry Probus (Henryk IV Probus or Prawy, "the Righteous"), High Duke of Poland (d. 1290)
- John I, French nobleman (House of Chalon-Arlay) (d. 1315)
- Liu Guandao (or Zhong Xian), Chinese court artist (d. 1336)
- Usman Serajuddin, Bengali Sufi scholar and mystic (d. 1357)

1259

- February 25 – Infanta Branca of Portugal, daughter of King Afonso III of Portugal and Urraca of Castile (d. 1321)
- March 25 – Andronikos II Palaiologos, Byzantine emperor (d. 1332)
- Pietro Cavallini, Italian painter (d. 1330)
- Demetre II of Georgia (d. 1289)
- Richard Óg de Burgh, 2nd Earl of Ulster (d. 1326)

== Deaths ==
1250

- February 2 – Erik Eriksson, king of Sweden (b. 1216)
- February 6 – Geoffrey VI, French nobleman and knight
- February 8
  - Andrew III, French nobleman and knight (b. 1200)
  - Fakhr ad-Din, Egyptian ruler and military leader
  - Robert I (the Good), French nobleman (b. 1216)
  - William Longespée (the Younger), English knight
- February 11 – Jean de Ronay, French Grand Master
- March 29 – Ludolph of Ratzeburg, German bishop
- April 6
  - Guillaume de Sonnac, French Grand Master
  - Hugh XI of Lusignan, French nobleman (b. 1221)
- May 2 – Al-Muazzam Turanshah, Ayyubid ruler of Egypt
- May 21 – Humbert V, French nobleman and knight (b. 1198)
- May 26 – Peter I (Mauclerc), French nobleman (b. 1187)
- May 27 – Raniero Capocci, Italian priest and cardinal
- June 7 – Vitslav I, Danish nobleman and knight (b. 1180)
- June 18 – Theresa of Portugal, queen of León (b. 1176)
- August 10 – Eric IV (Ploughpenny), king of Denmark
- October 4 – Herman VI, German nobleman and knight
- October 12 – Richard Wendene, English bishop (b. 1219)
- December 13 – Frederick II, Holy Roman Emperor (b. 1194)
- Alice of Schaerbeek, Flemish Cistercian lay sister (b. 1220)
- Gilbertus Anglicus, English physician and writer (b. 1180)
- Julian of Speyer, German Franciscan composer and poet
- Leonardo of Pisa, Italian mathematician and writer (b. 1170)
- Romée de Villeneuve, French nobleman and seneschal
- Shihab al-Din Muhammad al-Nasawi, Persian biographer
- Walter of Serviliano, Italian Benedictine hermit and abbot
- Yang Miaozhen, Chinese female military leader (b. 1193)

1251

- January – Bohemund V of Antioch
- February 9 – Matthias II, Duke of Lorraine
- March 6 – Rose of Viterbo, Italian saint (b. 1235)
- March 31 – William of Modena, Bishop of Modena
- June 6 – William III of Dampierre, Count of Flanders
- date unknown
  - Winter 1251–52 – Eljigidei, Mongol commander of Persia, killed
  - Isobel of Huntingdon, Scots noblewoman (b. 1199)
  - Oghul Qaimish, 3rd regent of the Mongol Empire, following her husband's death

1252

- January 1 – Saint Zdislava Berka, Bohemian lay Dominican benefactress
- January 23 – Isabella, Queen of Armenia
- January – Bohemond V, Prince of Antioch
- February 3 – Sviatoslav III of Vladimir, Prince of Novgorod (b. 1196)
- April 1 – Kujō Michiie, Japanese regent
- April 6 – Saint Peter of Verona
- May 3 or May 4 – Günther von Wüllersleben, Grand Master of the Teutonic Knights
- May 30 – King Ferdinand III of Castile and Leon
- June 6 – Robert Passelewe, Bishop of Chichester
- June 9 – Otto I, Duke of Brunswick-Lüneburg
- June 29 – Abel, King of Denmark (b. 1218)
- August 1 – Giovanni da Pian del Carpine, Italian chronicler of the Mongol Empire
- November 27 – Blanche of Castile, queen of Louis VIII of France and regent of France (b. 1188)
- date unknown
  - John of Basingstoke, English scholar and ecclesiastic
  - Henry I, Count of Anhalt
  - Sorghaghtani Beki, Mongolian empress and regent
  - Catherine Sunesdotter, Swedish queen consort
  - Yesü Möngke, Khan of the Chagatai Khanate

1253

- January 1 – Marino Morosini, doge of Venice (b. 1181)
- January 18 – Henry I ("the Fat"), king of Cyprus (b. 1217)
- April 3 – Richard of Chichester, English bishop (b. 1197)
- April 5 – Wilbrand von Käfernburg, German archbishop
- April 22 – Elias of Cortona, Italian friar and vicar general
- June 11 – Amadeus IV, Italian nobleman and knight (b. 1197)
- June 12 – Boniface II ("the Giant"), king of Thessalonica (b. 1201)
- July 8 – Theobald I, French nobleman and trouvère (b. 1201)
- July 22 – Albert IV, German nobleman and knight (b. 1180)
- August 11 – Clare of Assisi, Italian nun and saint (b. 1194)
- September 22 – Dōgen, Japanese Buddhist priest (b. 1200)
- September 23 – Wenceslaus I, king of Bohemia (b. 1205)
- October 9 – Robert Grosseteste, English bishop (b. 1168)
- October 22 – William de Vesci, English nobleman (b. 1205)
- November 16 – Agnes of Assisi, Italian abbess and saint
- November 21 – Christian II, German archbishop (b. 1185)
- November 29 – Otto II, German count palatine (b. 1206)
- Ahmad al-Tifashi, Almohad poet and anthologist (b. 1184)

1254

- March 28 – William de Ferrers, 5th Earl of Derby, English nobleman (b. 1193)
- May 21 – Conrad IV, king of Germany en Sicily (b. 1228)
- June 3 – Andrea Caccioli, Italian friar and priest (b. 1194)
- June 8 – Robert of Nantes, Latin patriarch of Jerusalem
- June 17 – Ingeborg Eriksdotter, Swedish princess (b. 1212)
- August 6 – Hugh of Northwold, English abbot and bishop
- September 25 – William III de Cantilupe, English nobleman
- November 3
  - John III Doukas Vatatzes, Byzantine emperor
  - Manuel II, Byzantine patriarch of Constantinople
- November 11 – Gil Torres, Spanish archdeacon and cardinal
- December 1 – Abel de Gullane (or Golynn), Scottish bishop
- December 7 – Innocent IV, pope of the Catholic Church
- December – Peter Chaceporc, English archdeacon and ambassador
- Berthold of Pietengau, German prince-bishop of Passau
- Faris al-Din Aktay, Egyptian nobleman and emir (prince)
- Rudolf von Ems, German knight, poet and writer (b. 1200)
- Silvester de Everdon, English bishop and Lord Chancellor
- Bab Bachir, spouse of last Abbasid caliph al-Musta'sim.

1255

- May 1 – Walter de Gray, English archbishop and statesman
- August 27 – Little Saint Hugh, English Jewish boy (b. 1246)
- Al-Faqih al-Muqaddam, Yemeni religious leader (b. 1178)
- Alice de Montfort, French noblewoman and ruler (suo jure)
- Batu Khan, Mongol ruler and founder of the Golden Horde
- Carintana dalle Carceri, ruler of the Principality of Achaea
- Denis Türje, Hungarian nobleman and military commander
- Eva de Braose, heiresses and wife of William de Cantilupe
- Helena Pedersdatter Strange, queen of Sweden (b. 1200)
- Majd al-Din ibn Taymiyyah, Seljuk judge and theologian
- Masanari, Japanese nobleman and waka poet (b. 1200)
- Muhammad III, ruler of the Nizari Ismaili State (b. 1211)
- Shams al-Din 'Ali ibn Mas'ud, Mihrabanid ruler of Sistan

1256

- January 4 – Bernhard von Spanheim, German nobleman
- January 18 – Maria of Brabant, duchess of Bavaria (b. 1226)
- January 28 – William II of Holland, king of Germany (b. 1227)
- February 9 – Alice de Lusigan, English noblewoman (b. 1224)
- February 16 – Nicola Paglia, Italian Dominican priest (b. 1197)
- April 12 – Margaret of Bourbon, queen consort of Navarre (b. 1217)
- April 23 – Sabrisho V, patriarch of the Church of the East
- May 1 – Mafalda of Portugal, abbess, previously queen consort of Castile
- May 6 – Peter Nolasco, French religious leader (b. 1189)
- May 12 – Matilda of Amboise, French noblewoman (b. 1200)
- May 28 – Guglielmo Fieschi, Italian deacon and cardinal
- June 13 – Tankei, Japanese Buddhist sculptor (b. 1173)
- September 1 – Kujō Yoritsune, Japanese shogun (b. 1218)
- September 21 – William of Kilkenny, English bishop of Ely
- October 14 – Kujō Yoritsugu, Japanese shogun (b. 1239)
- November 5 – Christina de Valognes, Scottish noblewoman
- Bertram de Criol (or Criel), English constable and diplomat
- Jacob Anatoli, French Jewish translator and writer (b. 1194)
- Johannes de Sacrobosco, English scholar and astronomer
- Klement of Ruszcza, Polish nobleman and knight (b. 1190)
- Najm al-Din Razi, Persian philosopher and writer (b. 1177)
- Pandulf of Anagni, Italian bishop and military commander
- Peter de Ramsay, Scottish nobleman, cleric and bishop
- Þórður kakali Sighvatsson, Icelandic chieftain (b. 1210)
- Rodrigo González Girón, Spanish nobleman and knight
- Sibt ibn al-Jawzi, Arab preacher and historian (b. 1185)

1257

- April 10 – Aybak, ruler of the Mamluk Sultanate
- April 26 – Euphemia de Walliers, English nun and abbess
- May 3 – Katherine of England, English princess (b. 1253)
- May 5 – Haakon the Young, junior king of Norway (b. 1232)
- May 17 – Ch'oe Hang, Korean general and dictator (b. 1209)
- May 20 – Maurice FitzGerald, 2nd Lord of Offaly, Norman Irish nobleman and knight, killed in combat
- c. May 20 – Roger Weseham, English bishop of Coventry and Lichfield
- June 4 – Przemysł I, Polish nobleman and co-ruler (b. 1221)
- June 8 – Simon of Elmham, English prior and bishop-elect
- July 29 – Matilda I (or Mathilde de Courtenay), countess in her own right of Nevers, Auxerre and Tonnerre (b. 1188)
- August 15 – Hyacinth of Poland, Polish missionary (b. 1185)
- December 24 – John of Avesnes, count of Hainaut (b. 1218)
- December 26 – Richard Blund (or Blundy), English bishop
- Lanfranc Cigala (or Cicala), Genoese nobleman and knight
- Maria of Antioch-Armenia, Outremer noblewoman (b. 1215)
- Mohammad Baba As-Samasi, Abbasid Sufi leader (b. 1195) (tradition places his death at 1354)
- Sartaq Khan (or Sartak), Mongol ruler of the Golden Horde, probably poisoned
- Stephen Bauzan, English nobleman, seneschal and knight, killed in battle
- Valdemar III, Duke of Schleswig (Abelsøn), Danish prince and heir apparent
- William of Cassingham ("Willikin of the Weald"), English warrior and guerrilla leader
- Yuan Haowen, Chinese politician, poet and writer (b. 1190)

1258

- January 6 – Konrad I von Wallhausen, bishop of Meissen
- February 20 – Al-Musta'sim, Abbasid caliph of Baghdad
- March 19? – Clement of Dunblane, Scottish cleric, friar and bishop
- March 26 – Floris de Voogd, Dutch nobleman (b. 1228)
- April 5
  - Juliana of Liège, Flemish nun, mystic and saint
  - Pełka (or Fulko), Polish archbishop of Gniezno
- April 14 – Rüdiger of Bergheim, German bishop (b. 1175)
- May 10 – Sewal de Bovil, English cleric and archbishop
- June 2
  - Edmund de Lacy, English nobleman and knight
  - Peter I, Count of Urgell (or Pedro), Portuguese prince (b. 1187)
- June 15 – Ada of Holland, Dutch noblewoman (b. 1208)
- June – Ibn Abi'l-Hadid, Abbasid scholar and writer (b. 1190)
- July 22 – Meinhard I, count of Gorizia (House of Gorizia)
- August 8 – Henry of Lexington, English cleric and bishop
- August 14 – John of Wallingford, English abbot, historian and writer
- August 18 – Theodore II Laskaris, emperor of Nicaea
- August 25 – George Mouzalon, Byzantine high official
- August 28 – Gerhard II of Lippe, German archbishop
- October/November – Walter Comyn, Lord of Badenoch, Scottish magnate, adviser and regent
- November 8 – Grzymisława of Łuck, Polish princess
- November 10 – William de Bondington, Scottish bishop
- November 23 – John Fitzgeoffrey, English nobleman
- Abu Yahya ibn Abd al-Haqq, Marinid sultan
- Al-Shadhili, Almohad Sufi leader (b. 1196)
- Al-Mahdi Ahmad bin al-Husayn, Yemeni ruler, killed in battle (b. 1216)
- Baha al-Din Zuhayr, Arab secretary and poet (b. 1186)
- Bartholomew of Brescia, Italian teacher and canonist
- Bruno of Altena-Isenberg, prince-bishop of Osnabrück
- Ch'oe Ŭi, Korean military leader and dictator (b. 1233)
- Eberhard von Sayn, German knight and Landmeister
- Fujiwara no Tomoie, Japanese nobleman (b. 1182)
- Guillaume de Chateauneuf, French Grand Master
- Hong Pok-wŏn, Korean general and official, perhaps executed (b. 1206)
- Ingerd Jakobsdatter, Danish noblewoman (b. 1200)
- John of Arsuf (or Ibelin), Outremer nobleman (b. 1211)
- Robert de la Piere, French magistrate and troubadour

1259

- January – Matilda II, Countess of Boulogne, ruler of Boulogne, queen consort of Portugal (b. 1202)
- February 7 – Thomas, Count of Flanders
- May 29 – King Christopher I of Denmark (b. 1219)
- July 21 – Gojong of Goryeo
- August 11 – Möngke Khan of the Mongol Empire
- October 7 – Ezzelino III da Romano, Italian ruler
- November 18 – Adam Marsh, English scholar and theologian
- date unknown – Matthew Paris, English chronicler
