= Li Quan (general) =

Chinese Jin Dynasty general (died 1231)

Li Quan (Chinese: 李全; ?–1231 AD) was a Chinese general of the Jin dynasty. Li Quan led the red-coat army, a group of nominally Southern Song loyalist bandits-turned-rebels operating in Jin territory during the Mongol invasion. He eventually took command of Shandong and played all three sides against each other, turning against the Song and joining the Mongols. He was subsequently killed during fighting Yangzhou. His wife Yang Miaozhen subsequently took control of his forces, retreated to Shandong, and with the blessings of Mongols transferred control of Shandong and Quan's former forces to their son Tan.
