= Cathedral of Alexander Nevsky (Volgograd) =

Cathedral in Volgograd

Cathedral of Alexander Nevsky Кафедральный собор Александра Невского (in Russian)
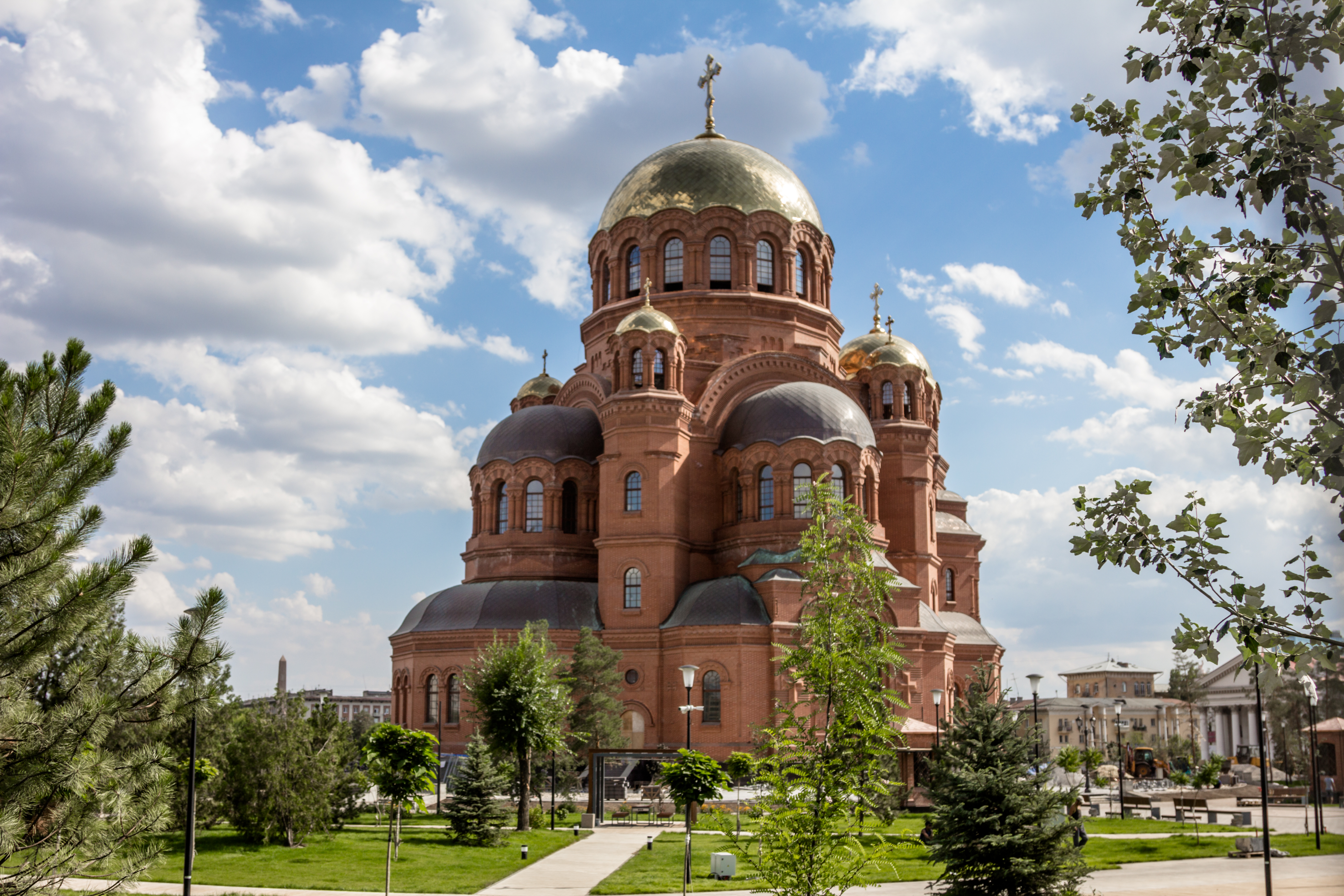
- Cathedral of Alexander Nevsky in Volgograd
- Cathedral of Alexander Nevsky; Кафедральный собор Александра Невского (in Russian)
- 48°42′34″N 44°30′49″E
- Location: Volgograd, Russia
- Denomination: Russian Orthodox Church
- Website: prihod.ru

History
- Consecrated: 2021

Architecture
- Architect: Lomakin Evgeniy Borisovich
- Style: Neo-Byzantine
- Groundbreaking: 2016
- Completed: 2021
- Construction cost: 1.4 billion rubles

Specifications
- Height: 58 meters

The Cathedral of Alexander Nevsky (Russian: Кафедральный Собор Александра Невского) is a cathedral in Volgograd named after the medieval Russian ruler Alexander Nevsky. In 1932 it was destroyed, and in 2016 it was decided to rebuild the temple under the same name, which met with criticism from residents of the location chosen for construction. The rebuilt temple was inaugurated in 2021.

== History ==
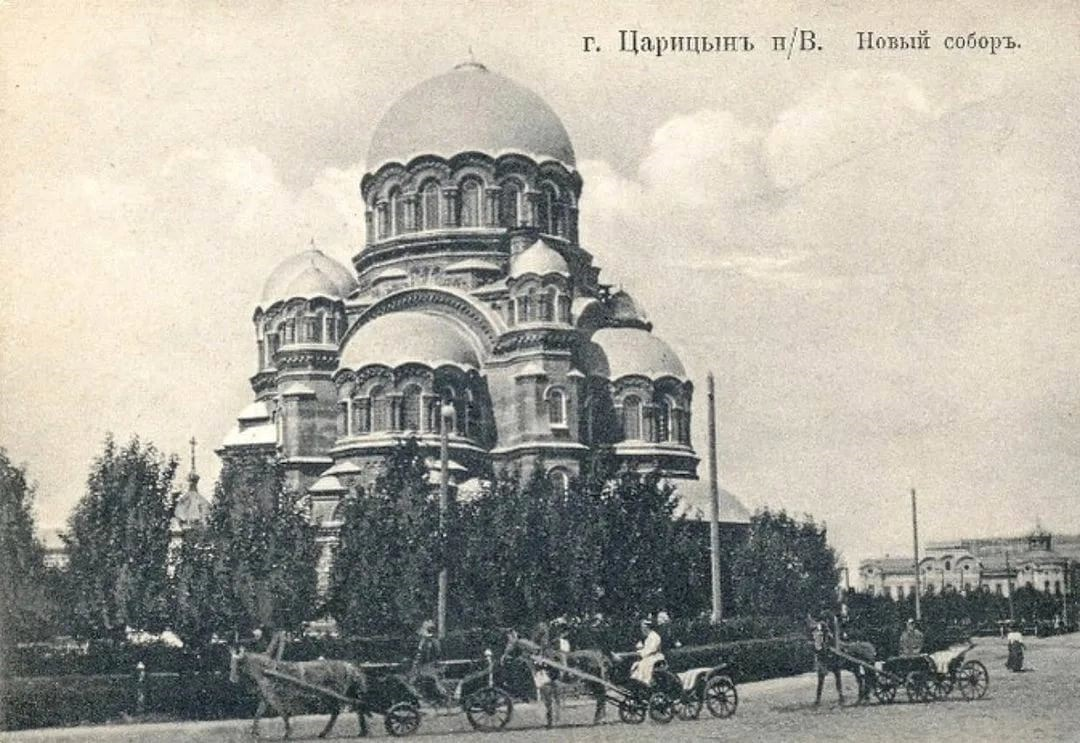
Cathedral of Alexander Nevsky in 1917

The cathedral was grounded during the Russian Empire, in what was then Volgograd (Tsaritsyn). It was built in memory of the rescue of the family of Emperor Alexander III in a railway accident in October 1888. The consecration took place on May 19, 1918. However, in 1929 the process of closing the cathedral began, and in 1932 it was blown up. At the beginning of the XXI century, a project was created to revive the cathedral.

== Construction ==
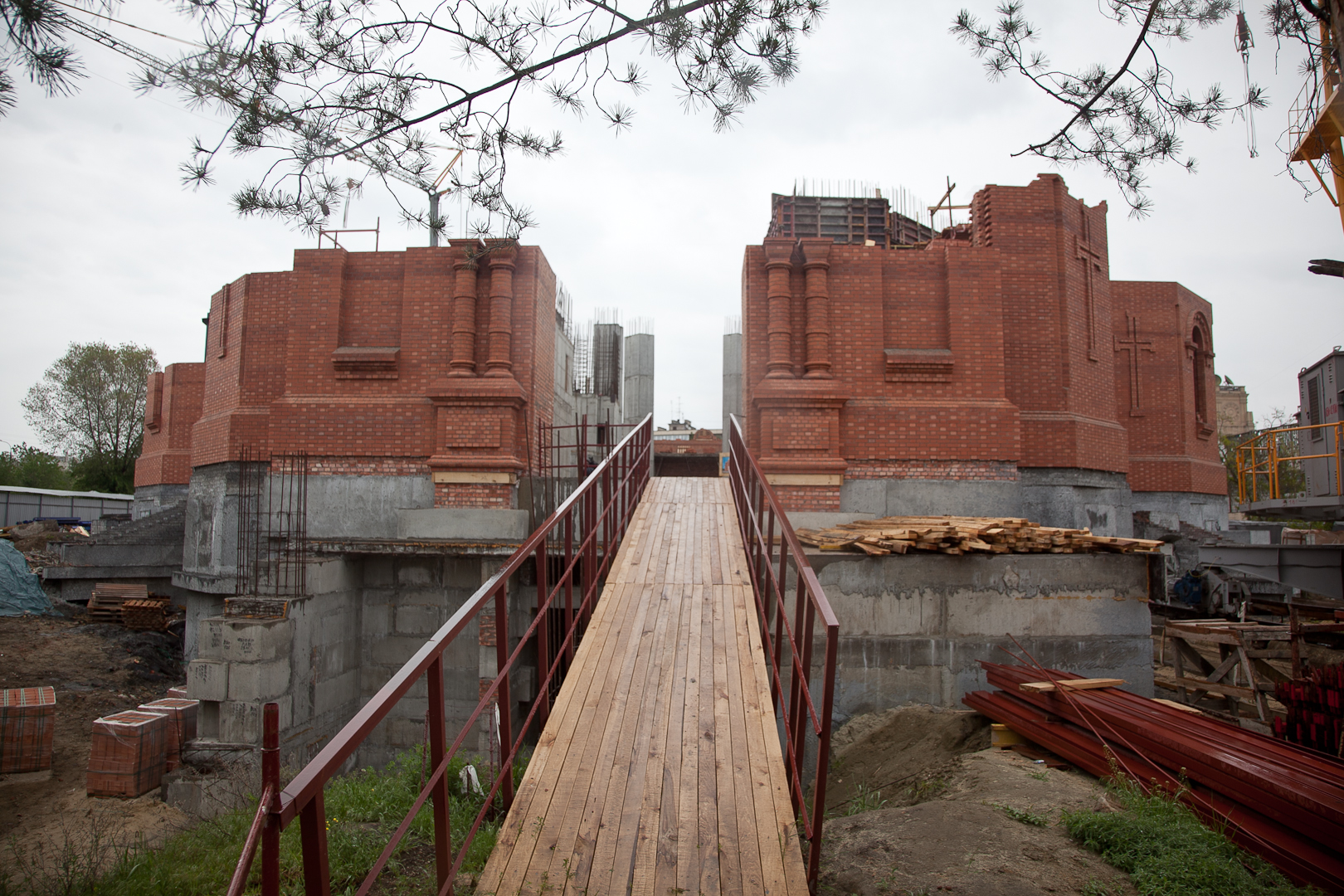
Construction of cathedral

The first foundation stone was laid in 2016. It was an old brick from the walls of a church blown up in the last century. On May 6, 2018, on the day of remembrance of Prince Alexander Nevsky, the first dome was raised on the cathedral. On November 23, 2019, the painting of the cathedral began with a prayer service before the beginning of every good deed. On April 9, 2020, a Byzantine cross weighing 2 tons was installed. On September 16, 2020, oak doors were installed at the main entrance. Construction was completed in 2021, and the temple was consecrated that same year.

== Criticism ==
The construction of the temple caused a mixed reaction among the townspeople. The main object of criticism was not the idea of restoring the temple itself, but the chosen place. Firstly, the temple does not fit into the already established architectural ensemble of the city, including the square of Fallen Fighters and Mira Street. Secondly, the temple is being built in the city center, which is already overloaded. Thirdly, construction is underway on the site of the park, despite the fact that after the collapse of the USSR, the area of the city's green spaces is only decreasing.
