= Dmitry of Pereslavl =

13th-century Grand Prince of Vladimir

Dmitry Alexandrovich
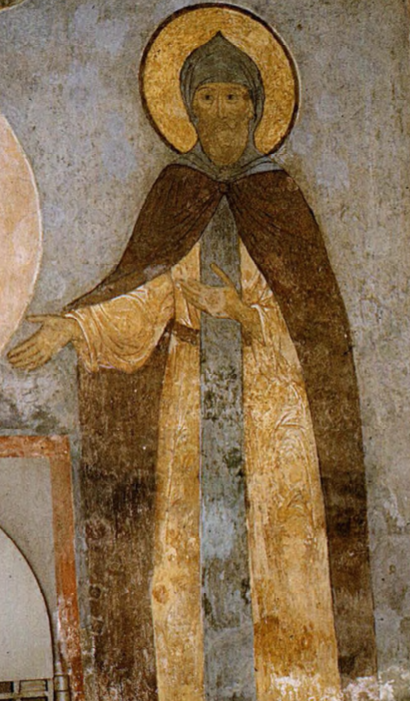
- Fresco from the Cathedral of the Archangel (17th century)

Grand Prince of Vladimir
- Reign: 1276–1281, 1283–1293
- Predecessor: Vasily of Kostroma
- Successor: Andrey of Gorodets
- Born: 1250
- Died: 1294 (aged 43–44)
- Burial: Saviour Cathedral of Pereslavl-Zalessky
- House: Rurik
- Father: Alexander Nevsky
- Religion: Eastern Orthodox

Dmitry Alexandrovich (Russian: Дмитрий Александрович; 1250–1294) was Grand Prince of Vladimir from 1276 to 1281, and again from 1283 until 1293.

== Biography ==
Dmitry was the second son of Alexander Nevsky. When his elder brother Vasily died young, Dmitry remained the chief heir to his illustrious father. As early as 1259, he was left by Alexander in charge of Novgorod. Upon Alexander's death in 1264, however, the Novgorodians expelled Dmitry to his native Pereslavl-Zalessky, citing his youth as a pretext.

Four years later, when Dmitry had turned 18, he was welcomed back to Novgorod and — together with his future son-in-law, Daumantas of Pskov — led a local militia against Livonian Knights in the Battle of Rakvere. During the following decade, he struggled for control of Novgorod against his uncles, Yaroslav III and Vasily of Kostroma. In 1276, when his elders died, he finally ascended the coveted thrones of Vladimir and Novgorod. Two years later, he founded a great fortress of Koporye, which he intended to rule himself. The Novgorodians revolted, forcing Dmitry to leave Koporye and Novgorod altogether.

While Dmitry was preoccupied with pacifying Novgorod, Andrey of Gorodets (Dmitry's younger brother) went to the Golden Horde and received from the khan permission to replace Dmitry as the Grand Prince. In 1281, Andrey returned to Russia, joined his forces with princes of Rostov and Yaroslavl and, after much devastation to Dmitry's lands, seized his capital Pereslavl. Dmitry fled to Koporye but, failing to win support of Novgorodians, had to retreat further northward, probably to Scandinavia.

Two years later, Dmitry returned to Russia, only to find his lands ravaged by the Mongols and his brother Andrey. Thereupon he went to the Black Sea and met Nogai Khan, who was the greatest enemy of the Golden Horde at that time. Wishing to increase his authority in Russia, Nogai vowed to support Dmitry in his struggle for the grand ducal throne. On hearing about this, Andrey renounced his claims to Vladimir and Novgorod and returned to Gorodets.

In 1285 Andrey again brought Mongol hordes to Russia, but these were expelled by Dmitry and his allies. Finally, in 1293 Andrey managed to unite the Mongols and Russian princes in opposition to Dmitry. Reluctant to renew fratricidal hostilities, Dmitry took monastic vows in 1293 and died the next year. He was buried in the Saviour Cathedral of Pereslavl-Zalessky.

== Genetics ==
In 2023, paleogeneticists (Zhur et al.) identified him as having the same Y-chromosomal line as most modern representatives of the Rurikid family. The results of the study were published in the journal Acta Naturae. Scientists identified his mitochondrial haplogroup F1b1-a3a2a, which belongs to the East Eurasian cluster, and the Y-chromosomal haplogroup N1a1a1a1a1a1a7a (N1a1-L550>Y4339>VL11).

== See also ==
- Family tree of Russian monarchs

== Bibliography ==
- "Димитрий Александрович" . Brockhaus and Efron Encyclopedic Dictionary (in Russian). 1906.
- Martin, Janet (2007). Medieval Russia: 980–1584. Second Edition. E-book. Cambridge: Cambridge University Press. ISBN 978-0-511-36800-4.

Regnal titles
Preceded by Vasily of Kostroma	Grand Prince of Vladimir; 1276–1293	Succeeded by Andrey of Gorodets
