= Bonconte da Montefeltro =

Bonconte (or Buonconte) da Montefeltro may refer to:

- Bonconte da Montefeltro, Count of Urbino (died 1241/2)
- Bonconte da Montefeltro (died 1289)
