= Yang Miaozhen =

Yang Miaozhen (Chinese: 楊妙真; c. 1193–1250) was a female military leader of the Red Jackets Army (紅襖軍) and warrior in medieval China.

A native of Yidu, she grew up in northern China during a turbulent, war-wracked time. In 1211, her brother Yang An'er (楊安兒) organized a group of roving bandits. Sometime after 1214, he was killed, and the 20-year-old Yang Miaozhen was chosen as his successor as the leader of a 10,000-strong band. She joined forces with and married Li Quan, another bandit chief.

In 1218, Li Quan pledged allegiance to the Southern Song dynasty, but he was never fully trusted. While Li Quan went out into the field on military campaigns against the Mongol Empire and the Jin dynasty, his wife ruled their base city of Huai'an (outmaneuvering the prefects sent by the Southern Song).

In 1226, Li Quan fought the Mongols, but was defeated and besieged in Yidu. He held out for a year, but Yang Miaozhen's attempts to reinforce him failed, and he surrendered to the Mongols in spring 1227 and switched his allegiance to them. They made him governor of Shandong. The Southern Song responded by cutting off food supplies to Yang Miaozhen. Her troops mutinied, but Li Quan marched to her aid and reestablished control.

In early 1231, Li Quan was killed attacking Yangzhou by the Song. After some attempts to find a male leader, his forces placed themselves under her. However, four months later, the Song attacked Huai'an. With defeat inevitable, Yang Miaozhen led her troops to join the Mongols, who in 1232 appointed her governor of Yidu. She was succeeded by her adopted son Li Tan, either soon after or after her death in 1250.
