= Battle of Adrianople (1254) =

1254 battle

- Part of the Byzantine–Bulgarian wars
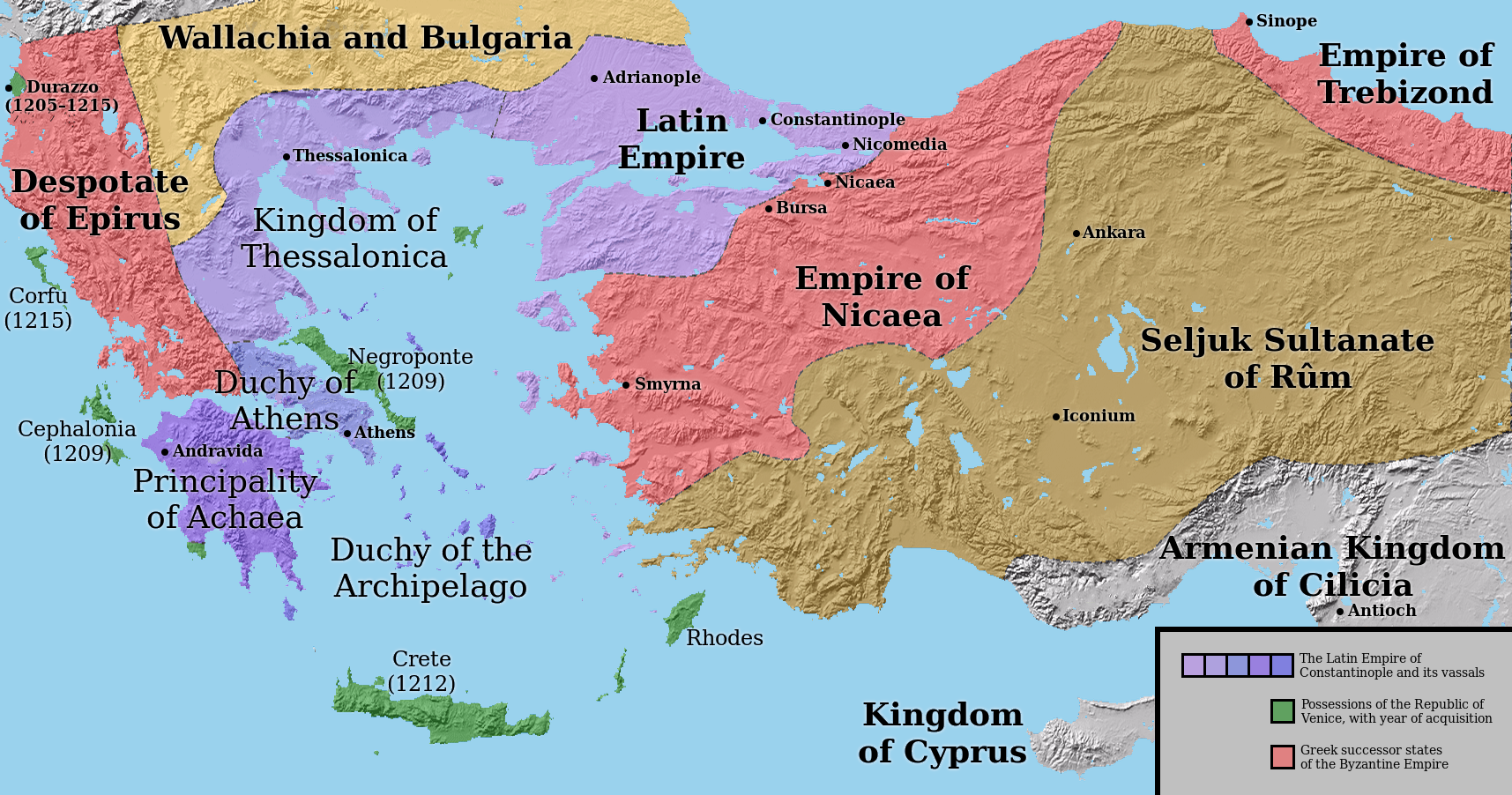
- The Latin Empire and the Partition of the Byzantine Empire after the 4th crusade, c. 1204
Date	1254
Location	Adrianople
Result	Nicaean victory

Belligerents
Bulgarian Empire	Empire of Nicaea

Commanders and leaders
Michael Asen II of Bulgaria	Theodore II Lascaris

Casualties and losses
1,000–3,000 killed or wounded	Unknown

The Battle of Adrianople was fought in 1254 between the Byzantine Greek Empire of Nicaea and the Second Bulgarian Empire. Michael Asen I of Bulgaria attempted to conquer land taken by the Empire of Nicaea, but the advance of Theodore II Lascaris caught the Bulgarians unprepared. The Byzantines were victorious.

== Background ==
In 1252, the Byzantine Emperor John III Doukas Vatatzes led a successful campaign against Epirus, seizing the towns of Kastoria, Ohrid, Prilep, and Vodena. By this point the Byzantines had a stranglehold on Constantinople, and Vatatzes made plans for its capture. However, Vatatzes died in 1254, and was succeeded by his son Theodore II Laskaris, who had epilepsy and was often ill.

== Battle ==
Shortly after his ascension to the throne, Theodore II found the Empires' newly won possessions in Thrace under attack by Michal Asen I of Bulgaria. Once in Thrace Theodore II was hindered by difficulties raising an army. After he assembled his troops, he himself led them into battle, successfully repelling the Bulgarians and preserving the Empires' borders.
