= Alexander Nevsky =

Grand Prince of Vladimir from 1252 to 1263

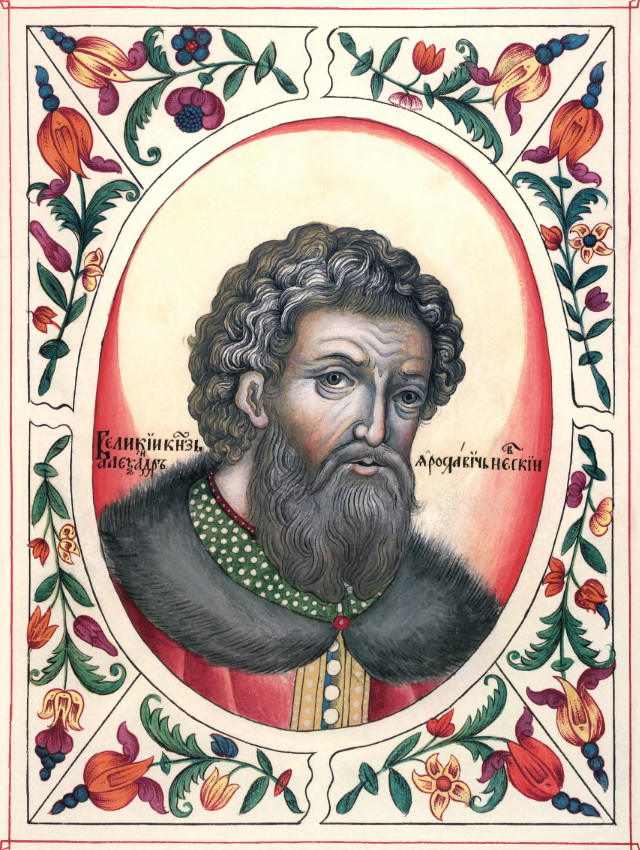
- Portrait in the Tsarsky titulyarnik, 1672

Prince of Novgorod
- Reign: 1236–1240
- Predecessor: Yaroslav V
- Successor: Andrey I
- Reign: 1241–1256
- Predecessor: Andrey I
- Successor: Vasily I
- Reign: 1258–1259
- Predecessor: Vasily I
- Successor: Dmitry I

Grand Prince of Kiev
- Reign: 1249–1263
- Predecessor: Yaroslav II Vsevolodovich
- Successor: Yaroslav III Yaroslavich

Grand Prince of Vladimir
- Reign: 1252–1263
- Predecessor: Andrey II
- Successor: Yaroslav III
- Born: 13 May 1221; Pereslavl-Zalessky, Vladimir-Suzdal
- Died: 14 November 1263 (aged 42); Gorodets, Vladimir-Suzdal
- Burial: Alexander Nevsky Lavra, Saint Petersburg, Russia
- Spouse: Alexandra of Polotsk
- Issue more...: Dmitry Alexandrovich; Andrey Alexandrovich; Daniil Alexandrovich
- House: Rurik
- Father: Yaroslav II of Vladimir
- Religion: Eastern Orthodox

Alexander Yaroslavich Nevsky (Russian: Александр Ярославич Невский; IPA: [ɐlʲɪˈksandr jɪrɐˈsɫavʲɪtɕ ˈnʲɛfskʲɪj]; monastic name: Aleksiy; 13 May 1221 – 14 November 1263) was Prince of Novgorod (1236–1240; 1241–1256; 1258–1259) and Grand Prince of Vladimir (1252–1263).

A grandson of Vsevolod the Big Nest, Nevsky rose to legendary status after victories over Swedish invaders in the Battle of the Neva (1240), which earned him the title "Nevsky" in the 15th century, and over German crusaders in the Battle on the Ice (1242). He agreed to pay tribute to the Golden Horde, which allowed him to preserve the Eastern Orthodox Church, while fighting against foreign powers to the west and the south. Macarius, Metropolitan of Moscow canonized Alexander Nevsky as a saint of the Russian Orthodox Church in 1547.

He is considered "one of the great heroes of Russian history", being credited with having "saved the Russian people from Catholicism and being enslaved by the Germans". Although he was already an important figure during his lifetime, his image as the defender of Russia has survived in the centuries after his death. Nevsky's military successes led his image to be used by Peter the Great in the construction of Saint Petersburg. His image was also used to promote patriotism in the Soviet Union, especially during World War II. The 1938 film Alexander Nevsky cemented Nevsky's reputation as a Russian savior. Critics of his legacy argue that the size and importance of his military victories were exaggerated for political purposes, and that he helped ensure the Golden Horde's dominance over Russia.

== Early life ==
Alexander was born in Pereslavl-Zalessky on 13 May 1221, although older historiographic tradition placed his date of birth on 30 May 1220. He was the second son of Yaroslav Vsevolodovich, a son of Vsevolod Yuryevich, who was the grand prince of Vladimir. Yaroslav held Pereslavl-Zalessky and the throne of Novgorod during the time of the Mongol conquest in 1237–1238; he inherited the Grand Principality of Vladimir in 1238 following the death of his elder brother, Yury.

There is no consensus regarding the identity of Alexander's mother; her name is given as Feodosiya in Alexander's vita (life). Russian scholarship traditionally identified her as a daughter of Mstislav Mstislavich from Yaroslav's second marriage. Many historians later identified her as a daughter of Ingvar Igorevich of Ryazan from Yaroslav's third marriage after N. A. Baumgarten published an article in 1908 on Alexander's genealogy. However, this hypothesis remains unconfirmed.

He spent most of his youth in Pereslavl-Zalessky. Little is known about the activities of Yaroslav's children before 1238. Alexander is first mentioned indirectly in 1223, when the chronicle of Novgorod records that Yaroslav went to Pereslavl-Zalessky with his children. Alexander is mentioned directly for the first time in 1228, when Yaroslav, who was the prince of Novgorod at the time, left the city for his own domain and left behind his eldest two sons to rule on his behalf. Alexander's eldest brother, Fyodor, died unexpectedly in the summer of 1233 at the age of 14, leaving Alexander as the eldest surviving son.

One of the first known references to Alexander Yaroslavich is in Tales of the Life and Courage of the Pious and Great Prince Alexander in the Pskov Chronicles (c. 1260–1280):

By the will of God, prince Alexander was born from the charitable, people-loving, and meek the Great Prince Yaroslav, and his mother was Theodosia. As it was told by the prophet Isaiah: "Thus sayeth the Lord: I appoint the princes because they are sacred and I direct them." ...He was taller than others and his voice reached the people as a trumpet, and his face was like the face of Joseph, whom the Egyptian Pharaoh placed as next to the king after him of Egypt. His power was a part of the power of Samson and God gave him the wisdom of Solomon... this Prince Alexander: he used to defeat but was never defeated...

== Reign ==
=== Prince of Novgorod (1236–1240; 1241–1256; 1258–1259) ===
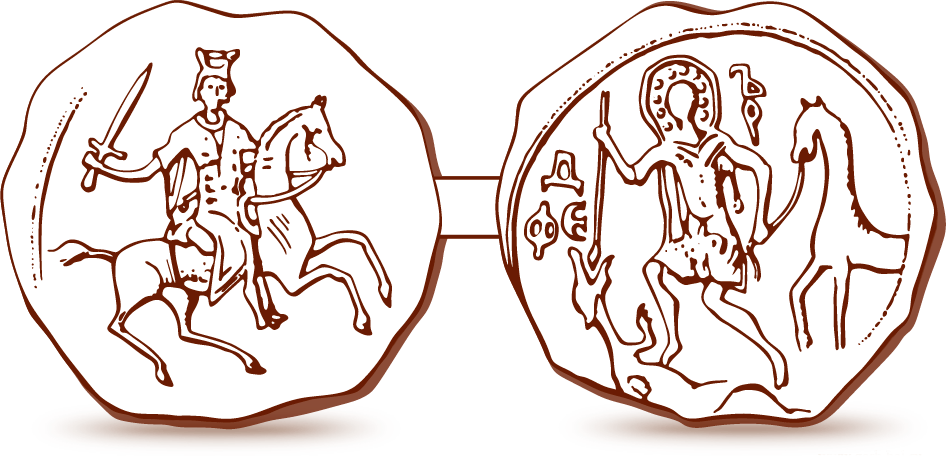
Seal of Aleksandr Yaroslavich (front and back) with images of the prince himself as a horseman and saint Theodore Stratelates. After 1236.

In 1236, Alexander was appointed by the Novgorod Republic as the prince of Novgorod (knyaz), where he had already served as his father's governor. He was chosen for the position by his father, but the decision was approved by the veche, which needed his armies. The Novgorod chronicle describes how Yaroslav left his son, Alexander, in Novgorod and took with him "senior Novgorodians" and a hundred men from Torzhok and "sat in Kiev upon the throne". When his father was called away in 1238 because of a Mongol invasion of Northeastern Russia, Alexander began to rule on his own.

In the Battle of the Sit River (1238), in which the Mongols effectively conquered the Grand Principality of Vladimir, the reigning prince Yuri II of Vladimir was killed. His younger brother, Yaroslav II of Vladimir (Alexander's father), requested and received from the Mongol khan his permission to become the new prince. As prince, he assigned Novgorod to his son Alexander.

Alexander continued to enforce the anti-Western views of his family, which made him unpopular among the veche.

==== Second Swedish Crusade and the Battle of the Neva (1240) ====
In 1240, three years after obtaining papal authorization, the Swedes launched the Second Swedish Crusade in the easternmost part of the Baltic region. The Finnish mission's eastward expansion led to a clash between Sweden and the city-state of the Novgorod Republic, since the Karelians had been allies and tributaries of Novgorod since the mid-12th century. The Swedish army was led by Birger Jarl and consisted of Norwegians and Finnish tribes. After a successful campaign into Tavastia, the Swedes advanced further east. According to Russian sources, the Swedish army landed at the confluence of the rivers Izhora and Neva in northwestern Russia, when Alexander and his small army suddenly attacked the Swedes on 15 July 1240 and defeated them in the Battle of the Neva.

The battle is not mentioned in any Swedish sources; all accounts of the battle are from two Russian sources, which are largely inadequate. Although some Russian sources written centuries later describe its as a very large battle, it is not clear if it was a huge battle or just part of periodic clashes between Sweden and Novgorod that was exaggerated for political purposes. Soviet-era historian Igor Pavlovich Shaskol'skii suggested that the attack was coordinated, referring to the Life of Alexander Nevsky, the only Russian source besides the First Novgorod Chronicle that mentions the battle, in which it is stated that the Swedes intended to conquer Novgorod. However, according to John Lister Illingworth Fennell: "there is no evidence of any coordination of action between the Swedes, the Germans and the Danes, nor is there anything to show that this was more than a continuation of the Russo-Swedish conflict for mastery over Finland and Karelia".

The event was later depicted as being of national importance, and in the 15th century, Alexander received the sobriquet Nevsky ("of the Neva").

==== 1240 Izborsk and Pskov campaign ====
In the September 1240 Izborsk and Pskov campaign, troops of the Bishopric of Dorpat, the Livonian Order, and the exiled pretender-prince Yaroslav of Pskov overthrew the pro-Suzdal faction which supported Alexander.

In late 1240 or early 1241, fearing the undue influence of Alexander over the veche and amid fears of him becoming a sole ruler, the Novgorodians banished Alexander to Pereslavl-Zalessky.

==== 1240–1241 Votia campaign ====
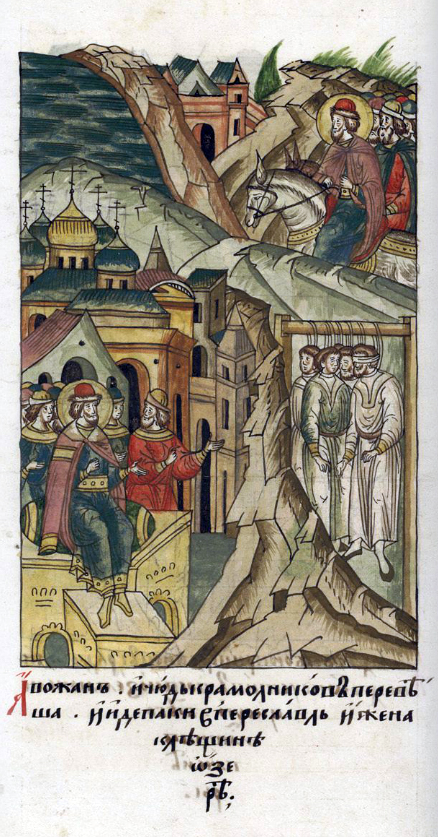
Execution of Vots and Chuds by Alexander Nevsky in Koporye, during the 1240–1241 Votia campaign (16th-century miniature)

In the winter 1240–1241 Votia campaign, the Bishopric of Ösel–Wiek, the Livonian Order, as well as Estonians (Chud') with support from local Votian leaders attacked Votia. It is unclear whether or not Votia was a tributary of Novgorod at this time. According to Anti Selart, the allies likely only intended to acquire pagan lands and convert them to Catholicism, rather than attacking Novgorod, which was already Christianized. On the other hand, the campaign was "a purely political undertaking which had nothing to do with conversion of pagans". Although the Northern Crusades were aimed at pagan Balts and Baltic Finnic peoples, rather than Orthodox Russians, several unsuccessful attempts were made to persuade Novgorod to convert to Catholicism, which were resisted by Alexander.

==== Battle on the Ice (1242) ====
The Novgorodian authorities recalled Alexander, and in the spring of 1241, he returned from exile and assembled an army. Alexander conquered Pskov and Koporye from the crusaders, executing the Votians that cooperated with the invaders. He then continued into Estonian-German territory. The crusaders defeated a detachment of the Novgorodian army. (Note: According to the Novgorod First Chronicle (NPL), this battle took place at an unidentified bridge, where the Novgorodians were killed (including commander Domash Tverdislavich), captured or chased away by the Nemtsy ("Germans") and Chud' ("Estonians").) As a result, Alexander set up a position at Lake Peipus. On 5 April 1242, in the Battle on the Ice, Alexander and his men faced the Livonian heavy cavalry led by Hermann of Dorpat, brother of Albert of Buxhoeveden. Alexander's army defeated the enemy, halting the eastward expansion of the Teutonic Order. Later in 1242, the Germans agreed to relinquish control of any Russian territory still occupied and to exchange prisoners of war. Later Russian sources elevated the importance of the battle and portray it as one of the great Russian victories of the Middle Ages.

The Livonian Rhymed Chronicle narrates the events of the battle:

There is a city in Russia called Novgorod, and when its king [Alexandre] heard what had happened he marched towards Pskov with many troops. He arrived there with a mighty force of many Russians to free the Pskovians and these latter heartily rejoiced. When he saw the Germans he did not hesitate long. They drove away the two Brothers, removed them from their governorship and routed their troops. The Germans fled and allowed the land to revert to the Russians. Thus it went for the Teutonic Knights, but if Pskov had been protected it would have benefited Christianity until the end of the world. It is a mistake to take a fair land and fail to occupy it properly. It is deplorable, for the result is sure to be disastrous. The king of Novgorod then returned home.

A Soviet evaluation presented Alexander's victories as having "saved the Russian people from sharing the fate of the Baltic tribes and the Slavs of the Elbe who were enslaved by the Germans". Igor Shaskovsky called the offensive the largest during the feudal period. On the other hand, historians like Fennell have doubted that this victory was a turning point in Russian history. He notes that the chronicle of Suzdal downplays the event to the point that Alexander's brother Andrey is seen as the hero.

After the Livonian invasion, Nevsky continued to strengthen the Republic of Novgorod. He sent envoys to Norway and, as a result, a first peace treaty between Novgorod and Norway was signed in 1251. Alexander defeated the Swedes in Finland after they made another attempt to block the Baltic Sea from the Novgorodians in 1256. In 1261, Alexander also made a treaty with Lithuanian king Mindaugas against the Livonian Order, but the planned attack failed as Alexander was summoned to Sarai by the khan.

=== Grand Prince of Vladimir (1252–1263) ===
Yaroslav was summoned to Karakorum, after which he fell ill and died on 30 September 1246. At a council in Vladimir held the following year, it was decided that Yaroslav's brother Svyatoslav would become grand prince, while Alexander would receive the Principality of Tver in addition to remaining as the prince of Novgorod. The Rurikid princes were obliged to appear before the khans in person, pay homage to them and receive their jarlig (patent) to be affirmed in their principalities. (Note: "The khans were recognized as suzerains of the Riurikid princes. Within the Rus' lands, however, they exercised their authority primarily through the dynasty. But the khans appointed and confirmed individual princes within the dynasty for each ruling position. Riurikid princes were, accordingly required to appear personally before the khans to pay obeisance and receive their patents to rule.") Svyatoslav did not go to the khan for confirmation, which caused Mikhail Khorobrit to expel his brother from Vladimir and claim the throne. Mikhail later died in a battle against the Lithuanians in 1248, which led to Moscow being without a prince.

Alexander's older brother Andrey was dissatisfied with the decision made at the council and he went to the khan, along with Alexander. In 1248, Andrey received the title of grand prince of Vladimir, while Alexander received Kiev, Chernigov, and "the entire Russian land". The two returned in the autumn of 1249. Andrey began to act independently in relation to the Mongols, and after creating an anti-Mongol coalition, a high-ranking official was sent to punish the princes. Andrey fled to Novgorod, but was not accepted there, so he was exiled to Sweden. Alexander assumed the title of grand prince of Vladimir in 1252, and was therefore the most senior of the princes at the time following the fall of Kiev.

Alexander faithfully supported Mongol rule within his own domains. In 1259, he led an army to the city of Novgorod and forced it to pay tribute it had previously refused to the Golden Horde. The chronicles say that Alexander had the help of nobles who "thought [the tax] would be easy for themselves, but fall hard on the lesser men". It then says that "the accursed ones," meaning the Mongols, "began to ride through the streets, writing down the Christian houses". According to Fennell: "the Tatar yoke began not so much during the invasion of Batu into Russia, but from the moment Alexander Nevsky betrayed his brothers".

Some historians see Alexander's choice of subordination to the Golden Horde as an important reaffirmation of East Slavs' Orthodox orientation (which begun under Vladimir the Great and his grandmother Olga of Kiev). Orlando Figes mentioned that "Nevsky's collaboration was no doubt motivated by his distrust of the West, which he regarded as a greater threat to Orthodox Russia than the Golden Horde (...) But Nevsky's realpolitik caused a problem for the chroniclers, particularly after he was made a saint by the Russian Church in 1547, for in their terms he had colluded with the infidel."

== Family ==
In 1239, to consolidate power, Alexander married Aleksandra, a daughter of Bryacheslav Vasilkovich, the prince of the Principality of Polotsk. They had five children:

- Vasily, prince of Novgorod (c. 1239 – 1271), betrothed to Princess Kristina of Norway in 1251 before the marriage contract was broken;
- Eudoxia Alexandrovna, married Konstantin Rostislavich of Smolensk;
- Dmitry of Pereslavl (c. 1250 – 1294), prince of Pereslavl and grand prince of Vladimir;
- Andrey of Gorodets (c. 1255 – 1304), prince of Gorodets and grand prince of Vladimir;
- Daniel of Moscow (1261–1303), prince of Moscow.

== Death and burial ==
In 1263, Nevsky visited Berke, leader of the Golden Horde, in a diplomatic mission. On 14 November 1263, while returning from Sarai, Alexander is reported to have fallen ill and died in the town of Gorodets-on-the-Volga. On 23 November 1263, he was buried in the church of the Monastery of the Nativity of the Holy Mother of God in Vladimir.

From the Second Pskovian Chronicle:

Returning from the Golden Horde, the Great Prince Alexander, reached the city of Nizhny Novgorod, and remained there for several days in good health, but when he reached the city of Gorodets he fell ill...

Great Prince Alexander, who was always firm in his faith in God, gave up this worldly kingdom ... And then he gave up his soul to God and died in peace on 12 November [1263], on the day when the Holy Apostle Philip is remembered...

At this burial Metropolitan Archbishop Cyril said, 'My children, you should know that the sun of the Suzdalian land has set. There will never be another prince like him in the Suzdalian land.'

And the priests and deacons and monks, the poor and the wealthy, and all the people said: 'It is our end.'

== Veneration and sainthood ==
Saint Alexander Nevsky
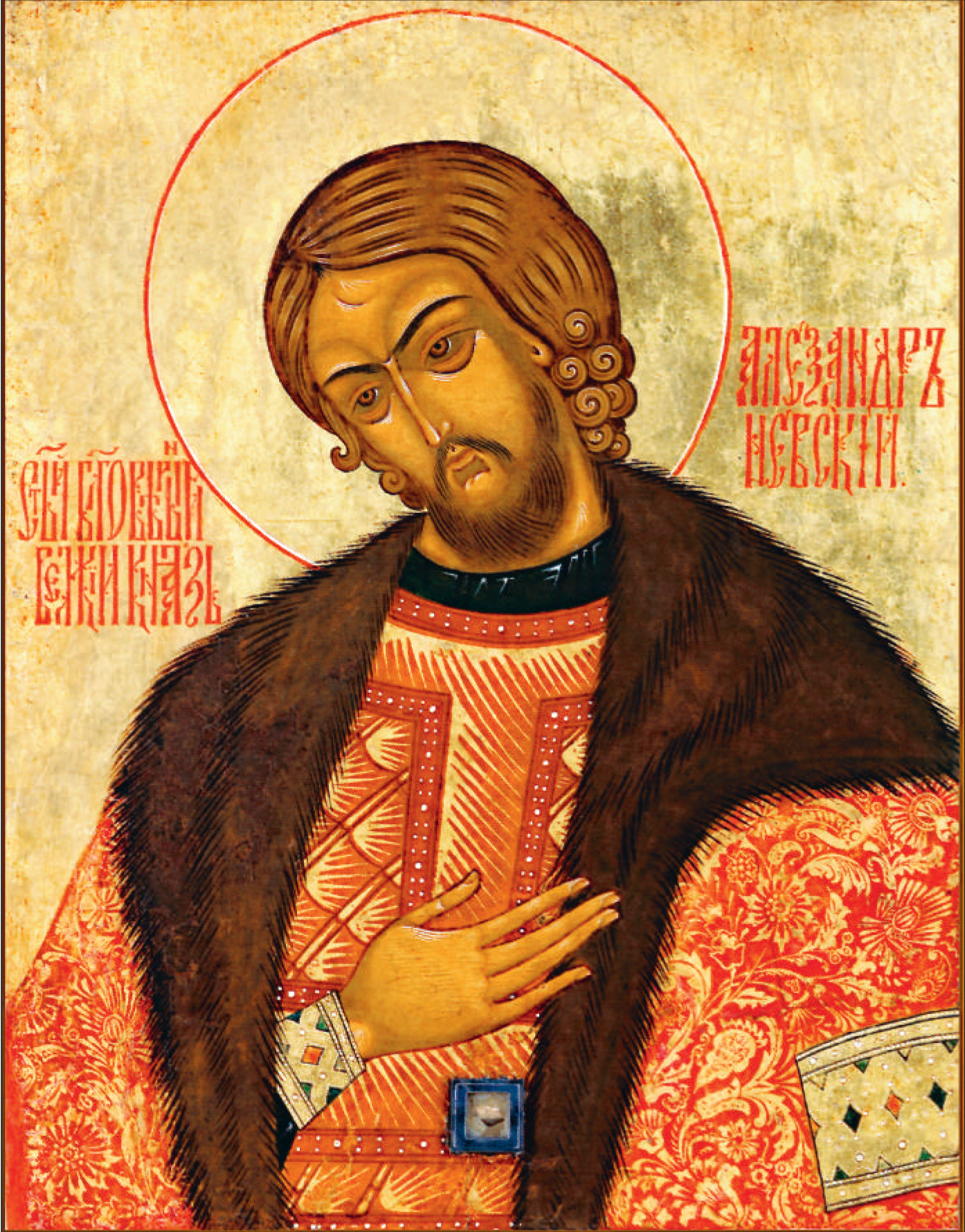

Grand Prince of Vladimir
- Venerated in: Eastern Orthodox Church
- Canonized: 1547; 479 years ago by Metropolite Macarius
- Major shrine: Vladimir; Pereslavl-Zalessky, Saint Petersburg
- Feast: 23 November (Repose); 2 May (Synaxis of the Saints of Rosand Yaroslavl); 30 August (Translation of relics)
- Patronage: Russian Ground Forces and Russian Naval Infantry

The veneration of Alexander began almost immediately after his burial, when he reportedly extended his hand for the prayer of absolution.

According to the Eastern Orthodox Church, on his death bed, Alexander took the Great Schema, strict monastic vows, and took the name Alexey.

In 1380, Alexander's remains were uncovered in response to a vision before the Battle of Kulikovo and found to be incorrupt. The relics were then placed in a shrine in the church. Alexander was canonized as a saint of the Russian Orthodox Church by Macarius, Metropolitan of Moscow in 1547.

In 1695, a wooden reliquary was made in Moscow, and the relics were placed in it in 1697. By order of Peter the Great, the relics were removed from Vladimir on 11 August 1723 and transported to Shlisselburg, arriving there on 20 September. They were kept there until 1724, when they were brought to Saint Petersburg and installed in the Annunciation Church of the Alexander Nevsky Lavra on 30 August 1724.

In 1753, a silver shrine with sarcophagus for the relics, made from 90 pounds of silver, was donated by Empress Elizabeth of Russia. With the completion of the Holy Trinity Cathedral of the Alexander Nevsky Lavra in 1790, the shrine and relics were translated there at its consecration on 30 August, one of the saint's feast days.

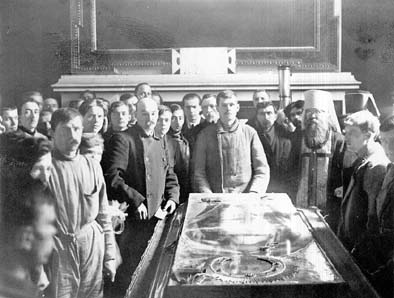
1922 opening of Nevsky's relics

During the 1922 seizure of church valuables in Russia, the sarcophagus was opened and the relics were removed. The elaborate silver shrine was transferred to the Hermitage Museum. The relics were put into storage at the Museum of the History of Religion and Atheism, before being returned to Holy Trinity Cathedral in 1989. On 10 May 2023, the Hermitage Museum and Alexander Nevsky Lavra signed a contract for the transfer of the shrine to Holy Trinity Cathedral of the Alexander Nevsky Lavra for 49 years. On 12 September 2023, Patriarch Kirill of Moscow returned the relics into the silver sarcophagus.

Alexander's principal feast day is 23 November (Old Style Calendar) or December 6 (New Style Calendar). A secondary feast day was instituted on 30 August (Old Style Calendar) or September 12 (New Style Calendar) in commemoration of his relics being placed in the Annunciation Church.

In February 2024, the memorial of Saint Alexander Nevsky was deleted from the synaxarion of the Orthodox Church of Ukraine. The exaltation of Alexander Nevsky has been used as religious justification of the Russian invasion of Ukraine.

== Legacy ==
Life of Alexander Nevsky (Житие Александра Невского) is a chronicle compiled in the late 13th century, in which Nevsky is depicted as an ideal prince-soldier and defender of Russia.

Life of Alexander Nevsky is a Russian illuminated manuscript of the 1560s that includes 83 illuminations and text that describe the life and achievements of Alexander Nevsky.

On 21 May 1725, Catherine I of Russia introduced the imperial Order of Saint Alexander Nevsky as one of the highest decorations in Russia. In 1942, during World War II, Soviet Union authorities introduced a Soviet Order of Alexander Nevsky to revive the memory of Nevsky's battles with the Germans.

In 1938, Sergei Eisenstein made one of his most acclaimed films, Alexander Nevsky, about Alexander's victory over the Teutonic Knights. The film is an instructive parable on German aggression and the struggle to protect Russia; the film cemented the storyline of Nevsky as the savior of Russia. The soundtrack for the film was written by Sergei Prokofiev, who also reworked the score into a concert cantata. The film is renowned for its depiction of the Battle on the Ice, which has served as inspiration for many other films. In the film, Nevsky used Russian proverbs, tying him firmly to Russian tradition. The proverbial phrase (paraphrasing Matthew 26:52), "Whoever will come to us with a sword, from a sword will perish," is a phrase that came from Eisenstein's film, where it was said by actor Nikolay Cherkasov, who played Nevsky.

During World War II, many Soviet historians portrayed Nevsky as a Russian bastion against both German and papal aggression. The government sought historical continuity by referring to the Soviet struggle as the Great Patriotic War. The film Alexander Nevsky was re-released in 1941 following Operation Barbarossa; Joseph Stalin used the film to mobilize feelings of Russian patriotism.

There have been several Russian naval vessels named after Nevsky including:

- the 19th-century sail&propeller frigate Alexander Nevsky
- Russian submarine Alexander Nevsky (K-550), a nuclear powered ballistic missile submarine currently in service with the Russian Navy
- The U.S. S.S. Henry W. Corbett, launched in 1943 in Portland, Oregon, which was lent to the U.S.S.R. during World War II and never returned; instead it was renamed the Alexander Nevsky.

In 2008, Nevsky was declared the main hero of the history of Russia by popular vote. In December 2008, he was voted the greatest Russian in the Name of Russia television poll.

In September 2022, an all-volunteer battalion tactical group to support the Russian invasion of Ukraine was named after Nevsky.

Alexander Beglov, governor of Saint Petersburg erected a statue of Nevsky in Mariupol after the city was devastated during the Russian invasion of Ukraine.

=== Notable namesakes ===
- Alexander Nevsky Bridge in Saint Petersburg
- Nevsky District, district of Saint Petersburg, Russia
- Nevsky Prospect, the main street of Saint Petersburg
- Nevskoye Microdistrict, a part of Kaliningrad, Russia

==== Buildings ====
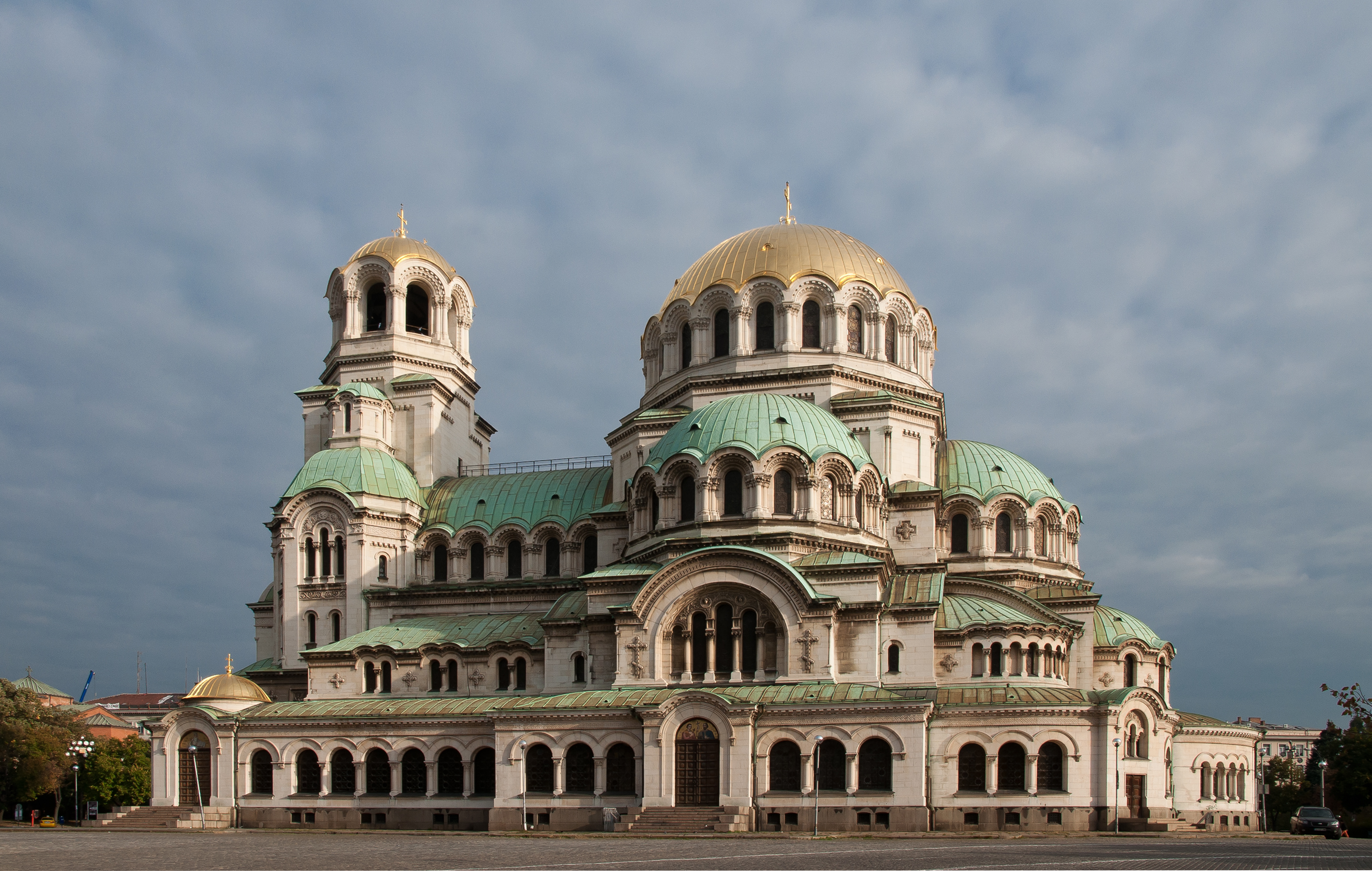
Alexander Nevsky Cathedral, Sofia

There are notable buildings named after Nevsky, mostly in places where the Russian Orthodox Church had a strong influence, as follows:

- Alexander Nevsky Lavra, Saint Petersburg, founded by Peter the Great in 1710
- Alexander Nevsky Cathedral, Tallinn
- Alexander Nevsky Cathedral, Paris
- Cathedral of Alexander Nevsky (Volgograd)
- Alexander Nevsky Cathedral, Yalta
- Saint Alexander Nevsky Cathedral, Sofia
- Alexander Nevsky Cathedral, Allison Park
- Alexander Nevsky Cathedral, Howell

== See also ==
- Family tree of Russian monarchs

== Gallery ==
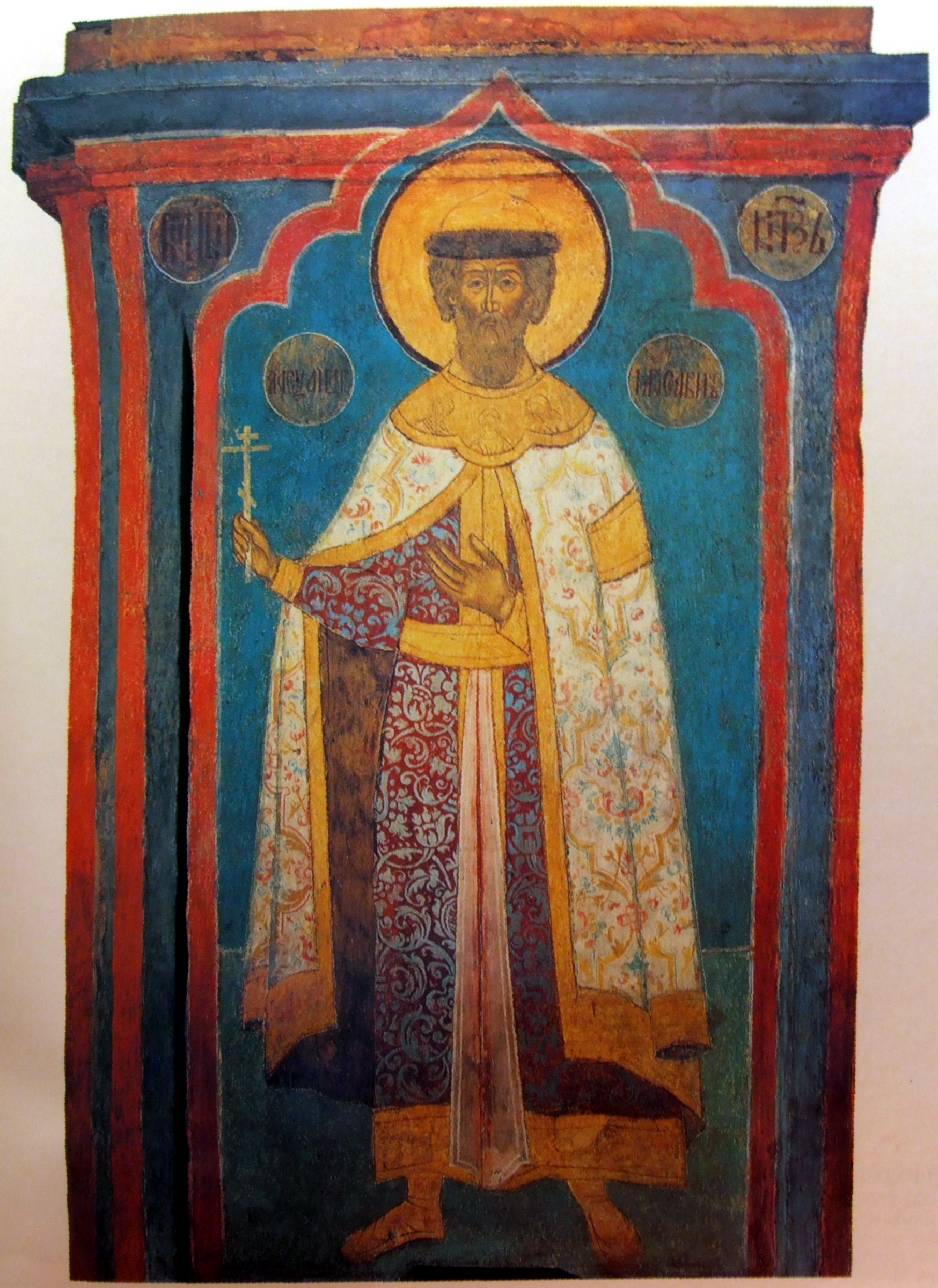
Saint Alexander Nevsky, 1666 fresco in the Cathedral of the Archangel, Moscow

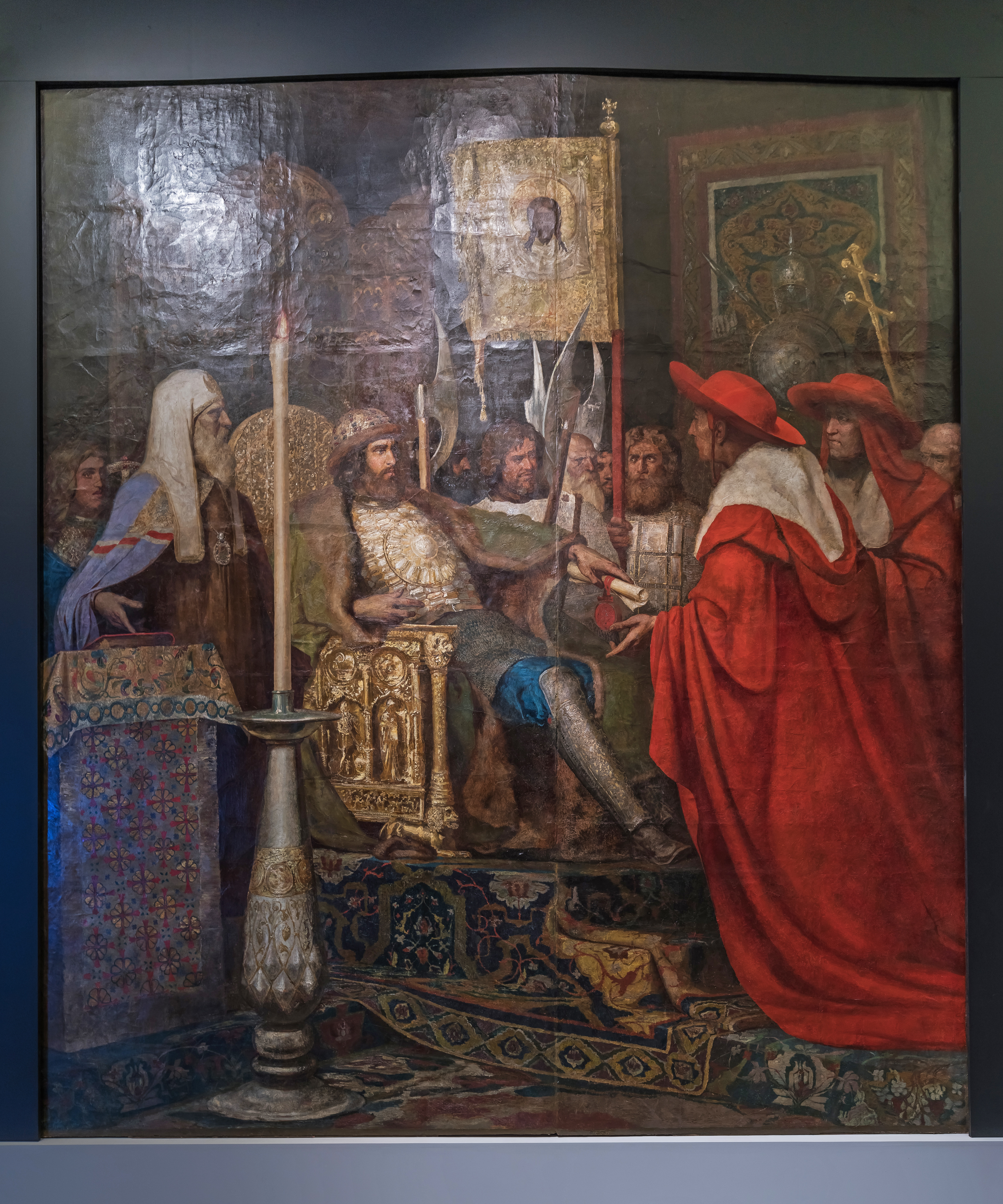
Prince Alexander Nevsky receiving Papal legates, painting by Henryk Siemiradzki (1870s)

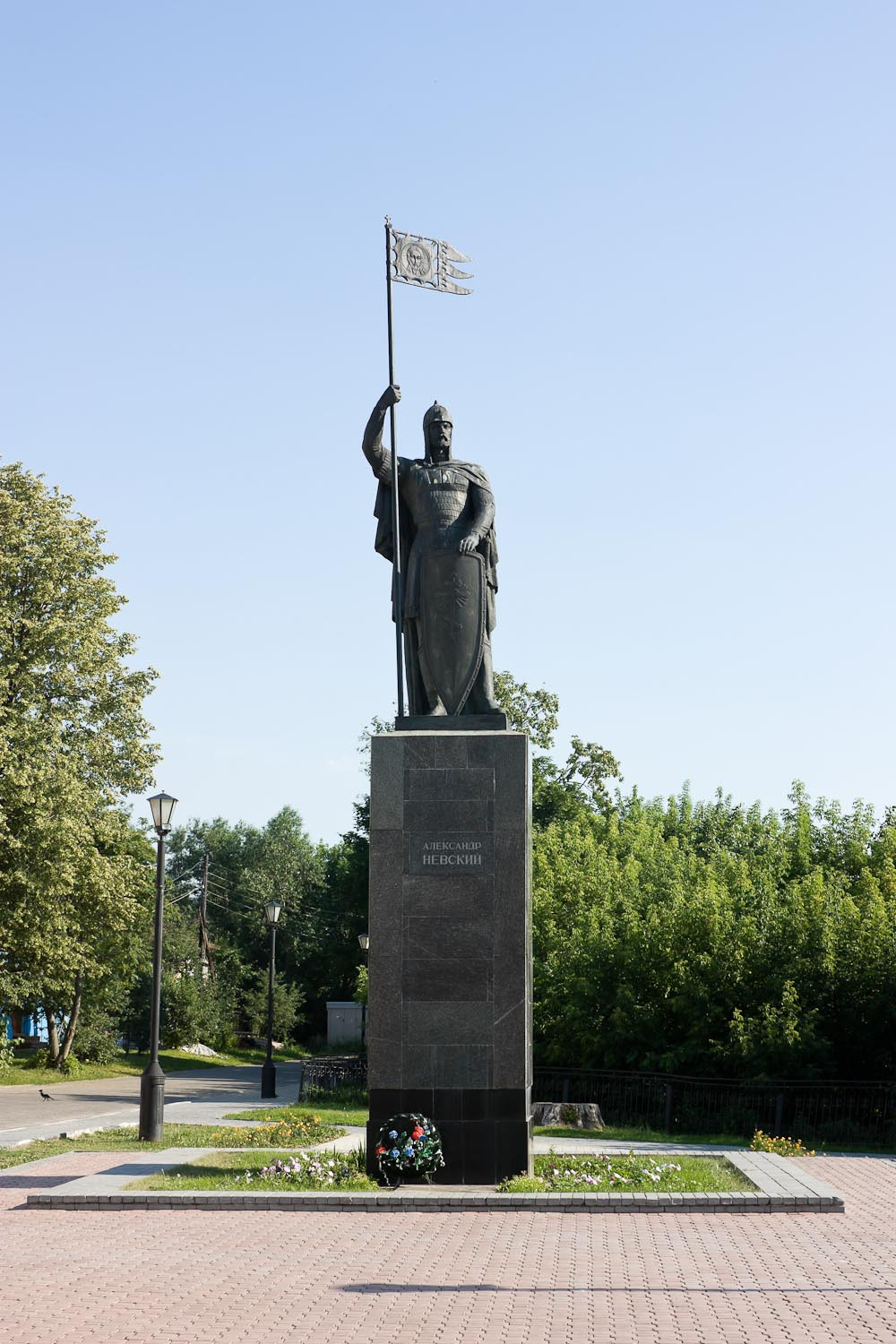
A statue of Alexander Nevsky in Gorodets

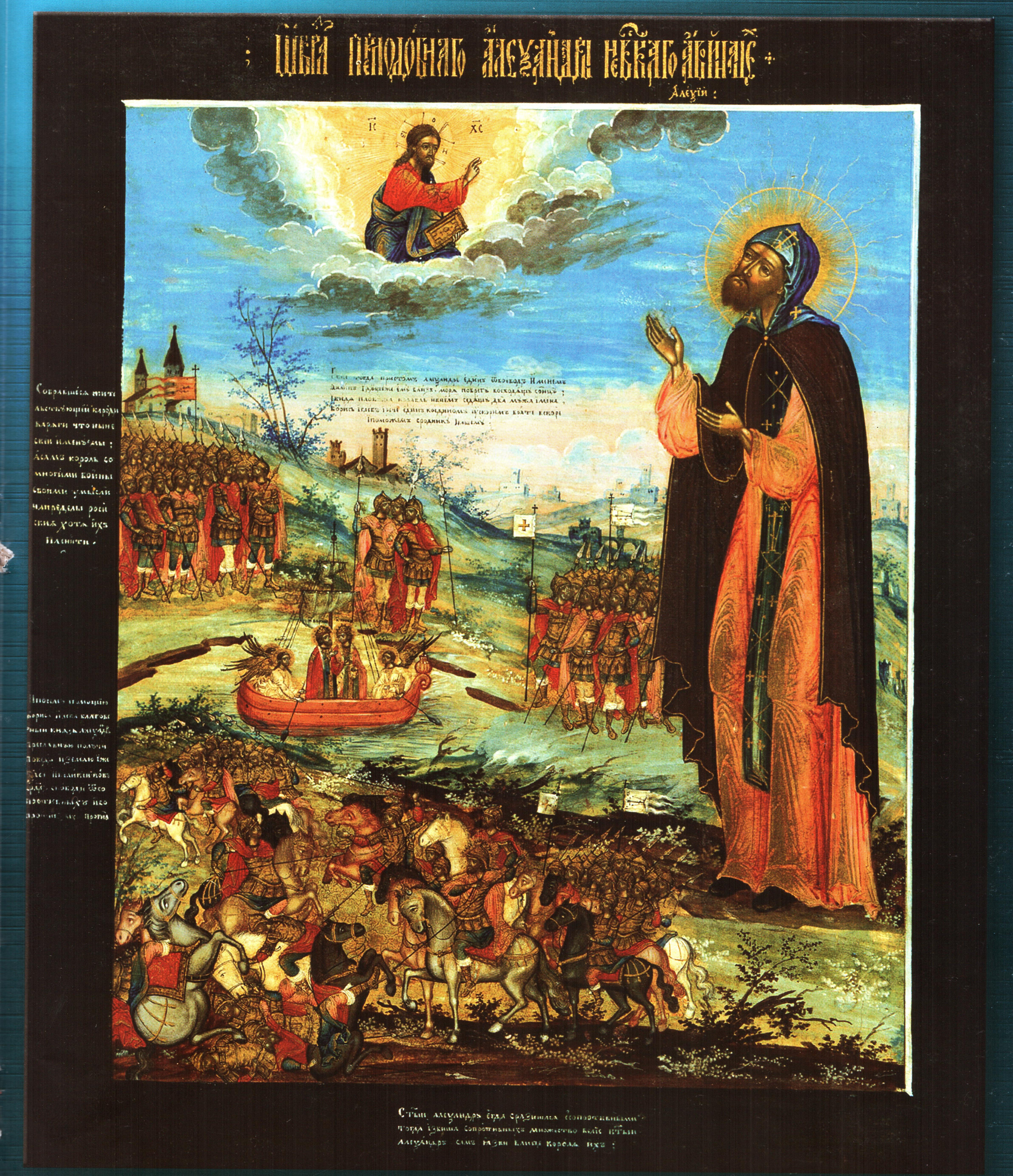
Icon of Alexander Nevsky with scenes from his life - Nevyansk, Bogatyrev Workshop (1820s-30s)

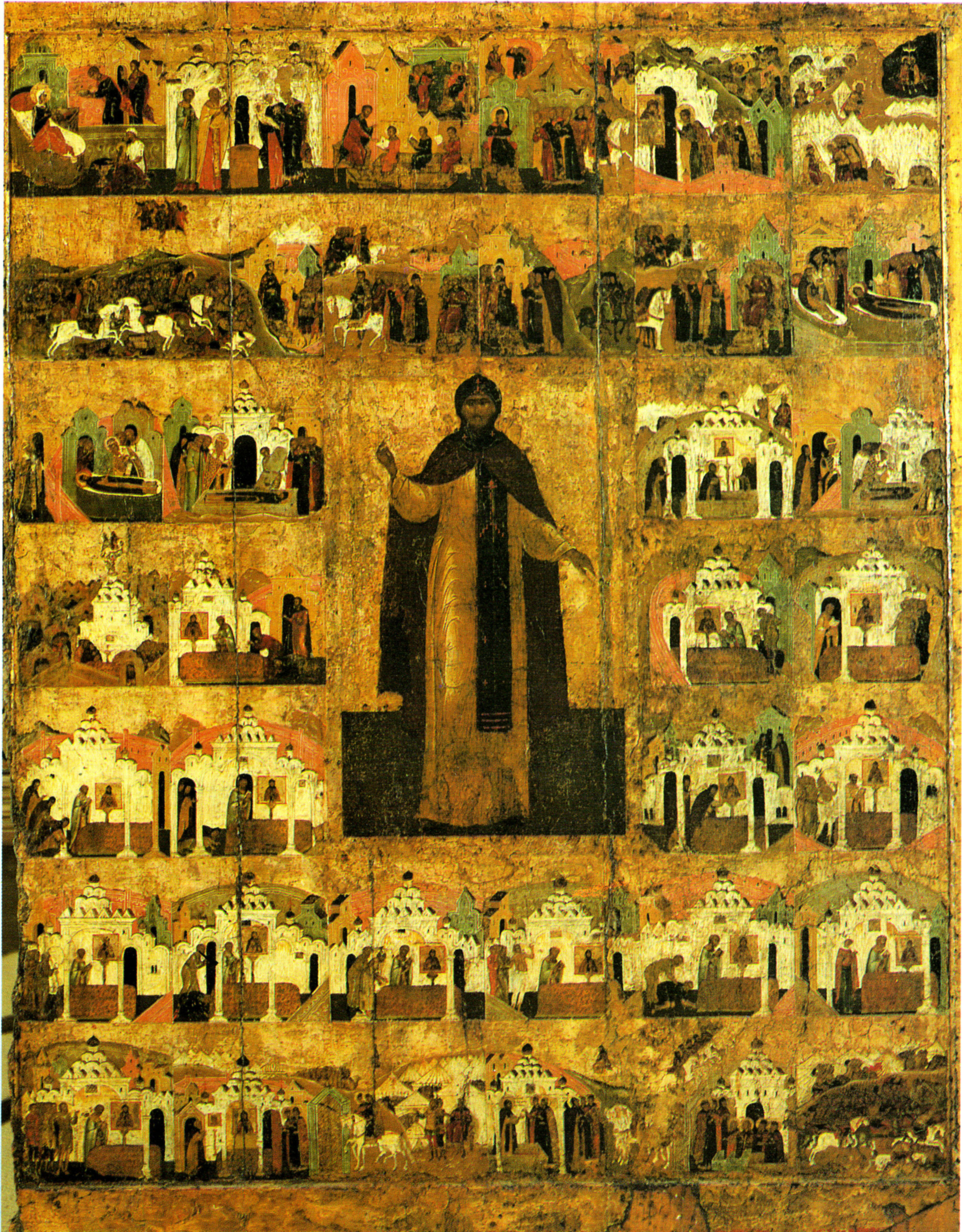
Icon of Alexander Nevsky with scenes - Pokrovsky Cathedral, Moscow (16th Century)

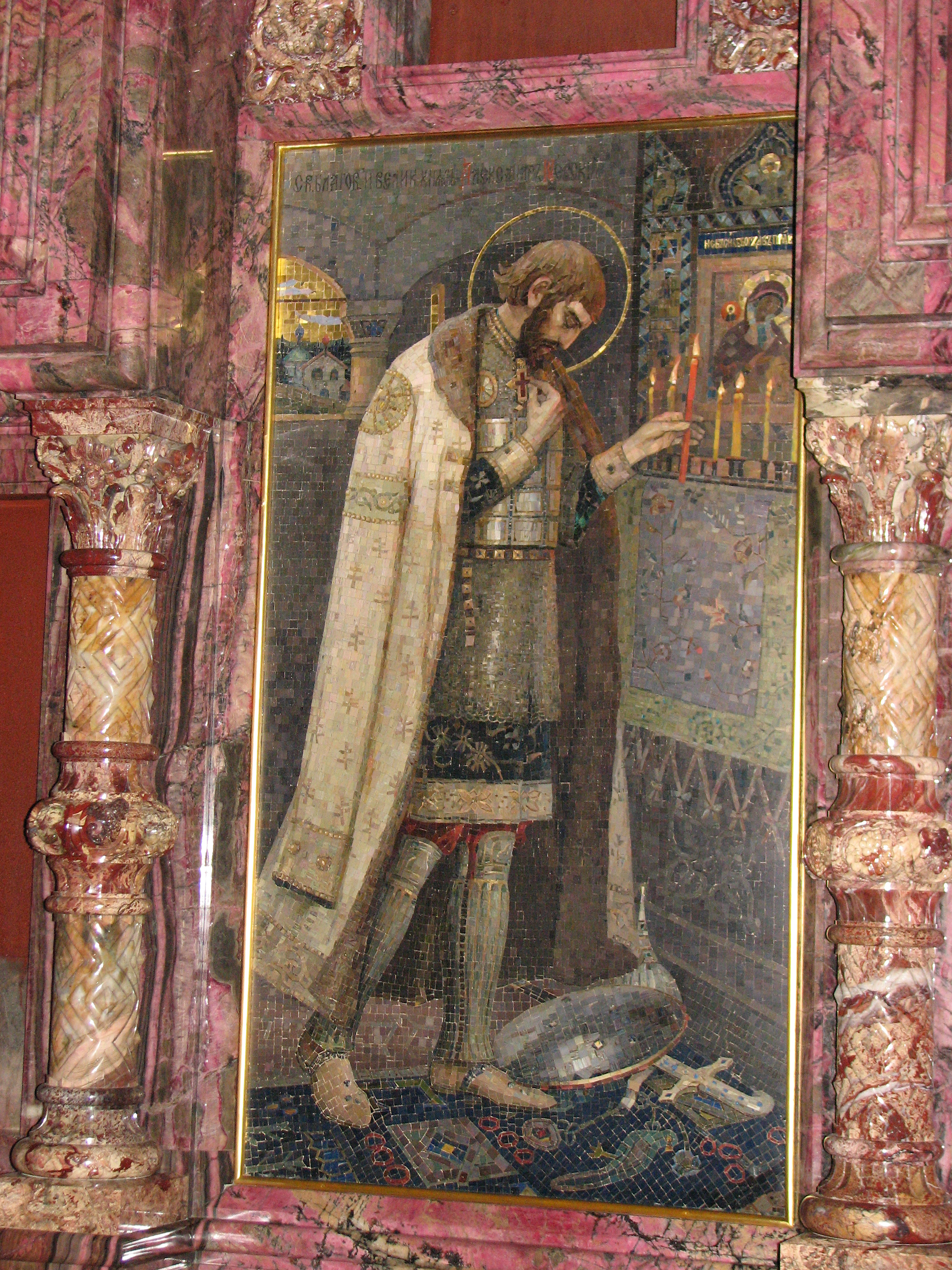
Mosaic icon on the iconostasis of the Savior on Spilled Blood "Alexander Nevsky" - Mikhail Nesterov (1894-1895)

== Bibliography ==
=== Primary sources ===
- Livonian Rhymed Chronicle (LRC, c. 1290s).
  - Meyer, Leo (1876). Livländische Reimchronik, mit Anmerkungen, Namenverzeichniss und Glossar herausgegeben von Leo Meyer [Livonian Rhymed Chronicle, with Annotations, Index of Names and Glossary, edited by Leo Meyer] (in Latin). (Reprint: Hildesheim 1963). Verses 2235–2262.
  - Smith, Jerry C.; Urban, William L., eds. (1977). The Livonian Rhymed Chronicle: Translated with an Historical Introduction, Maps and Appendices. Uralic and Altaic series. Bloomington: Indiana University Press. p. 181. ISBN 978-0-87750-213-5.
- Synod Scroll (Older Redaction) of the Novgorod First Chronicle (NPL, c. 1315).
  - Michell, Robert; Forbes, Nevill (1914). The Chronicle of Novgorod 1016–1471. Translated from the Russian by Robert Michell and Nevill Forbes, Ph.D. Reader in Russian in the University of Oxford, with an introduction by C. Raymond Beazley and A. A. Shakhmatov (PDF). London: Gray's Inn. p. 237.

=== Literature ===
- Dukes, Paul (1998). A History of Russia: Medieval, Modern, Contemporary, C. 882–1996. Duke University Press. ISBN 978-0-8223-2096-8.
- Favereau, Marie (20 April 2021). The Horde: How the Mongols Changed the World. Harvard University Press. ISBN 978-0-674-25998-0.
- Fennell, John (13 October 2014). The Crisis of Medieval Russia 1200-1304. Routledge. p. 106. ISBN 978-1-317-87313-6.
- Fennell, John (23 September 2022). The Emergence of Moscow, 1304-1359. University of California Press. ISBN 978-0-520-34758-8.
- Fonnesberg-Schmidt, Iben (2007). The popes and the Baltic crusades, 1147–1254. Brill Publishers. ISBN 9789004155022.
- Isoaho, Mari (2006). The Image of Aleksandr Nevskiy in Medieval Russia: Warrior and Saint. Brill. ISBN 978-90-04-15101-7.
- Kuchkin, V. A. (1996). "Александр Невский — государственный деятель и полководец средневековой Руси". Отечественная история (5): 18–33.
- Martin, Janet (2007). Medieval Russia: 980–1584 (2nd ed.). Cambridge: Cambridge University Press. ISBN 978-0-511-36800-4.
- Nazarova, Evgeniya L. (30 August 2006). Murray, Alan V. (ed.). The Crusades: An Encyclopedia [4 volumes]. Bloomsbury Publishing. pp. 42–43. ISBN 978-1-57607-862-4.
- Nicolle, David (15 March 1997). Lake Peipus 1242: Battle of the ice. Bloomsbury Publishing. ISBN 978-1-85532-553-1.
- Selart, Anti (2015). "Chapter 3: Livonia and Rus' in the 1230s and 1240s". Livonia, Rus' and the Baltic Crusades in the Thirteenth Century. Leiden/Boston: Brill Publishers. pp. 127–170. doi:10.1163/9789004284753_005. ISBN 978-90-04-28475-3.
- Shaikhutdinov, Marat (2021). Between East and West: The Formation of the Moscow State. Academic Studies Press. doi:10.2307/j.ctv249sgn2. ISBN 978-1-64469-713-9. JSTOR j.ctv249sgn2.
- Välimäki, Reima (December 2022). Medievalism in Finland and Russia: Twentieth- and Twenty-First Century Aspects. Bloomsbury Publishing. ISBN 978-1-350-23288-4.
- Vodoff, Vladimir (2000). "Alexander Nevsky (1220–1263)". In Vauchez, André; Lapidge, Michael (eds.). Encyclopedia of the Middle Ages. Fitzroy Dearborn Publishers. p. 37. ISBN 978-1-57958-282-1.

Regnal titles
Preceded by Andrew II	Grand Prince of Vladimir; 1252–1263	Succeeded by Yaroslav III
Preceded by Yaroslav II	Grand Prince of Kiev (titular); 1246–1263	Succeeded by Yaroslav III
