= Epirote–Nicaean conflict =

Military conflict

Date	1257–1259
Location	Balkans
Result	Nicaean victory; Subsequent restoration of Byzantine Empire

Belligerents
Despotate of Epirus; Kingdom of Serbia	Empire of Nicaea

Commanders and leaders
Michael II	Theodore II Laskaris; Michael VIII Palaiologos; George Akropolites (POW); John Doukas Palaiologos

In the period between 1257 and 1259 the Despotate of Epirus and Empire of Nicaea fought each other for Byzantine territories. Nicaea had by 1253 occupied Macedonia and Albania, and forced Despot Michael II of Epirus to submission. Michael II, fearing an Nicaean attack after Theodore II Laskaris' defeat of the Bulgarians (1255–56), allied himself with Serbian king Stefan Uroš I. The Epirotes involved chieftains in Albania in the springtime of 1257, and the Epirote and Serbian armies then coordinated their attacks. Michael regained most of Albania, then sent forces into Macedonia.

== See also ==
- Battle of Pelagonia

== Sources ==
- Fine, John V. A. (1994) [1987]. The Late Medieval Balkans: A Critical Survey from the Late Twelfth Century to the Ottoman Conquest. Ann Arbor, Michigan: University of Michigan Press. ISBN 978-0-472-10079-8.
- Setton, Kenneth M. (1976). The Papacy and the Levant (1204–1571), Volume I: The Thirteenth and Fourteenth Centuries. Vol. 1. Philadelphia: The American Philosophical Society. pp. 74ff. ISBN 0-87169-114-0.
- Treadgold, Warren (1997). A History of the Byzantine State and Society. Stanford, California: Stanford University Press. pp. 731ff. ISBN 0-8047-2630-2.
