= Ren Renfa =

Chinese artist and government official (1254–1327)

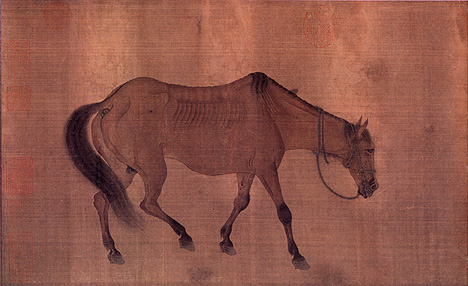
Detail showing the Lean Horse from Fat and Lean Horses

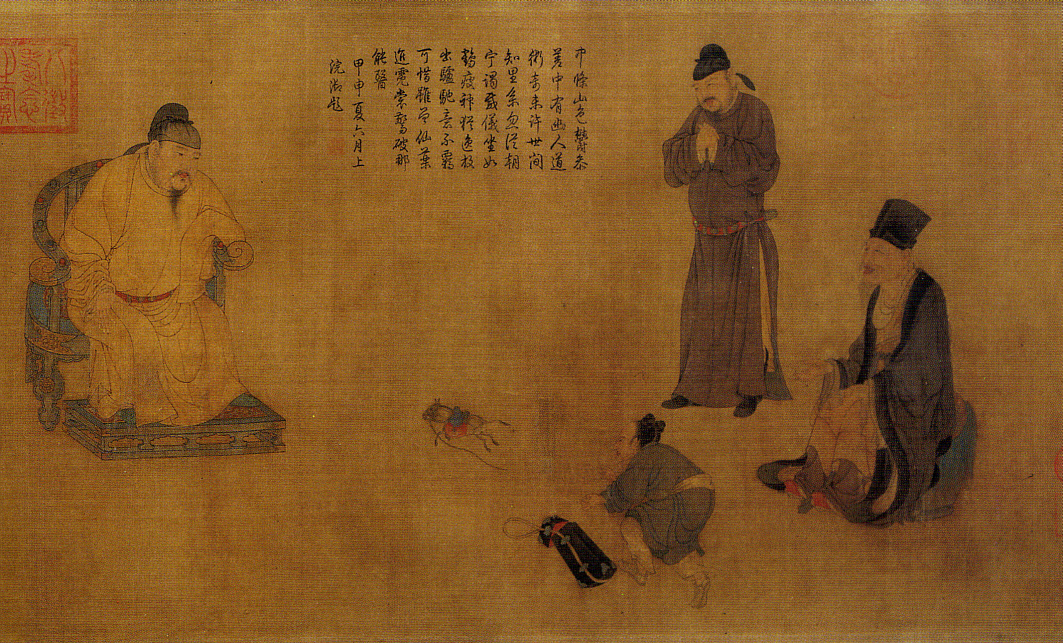
Zhang Guo Having an Audience with Emperor Xuanzong of Tang

Ren Renfa (simplified Chinese: 任仁发; traditional Chinese: 任仁發; pinyin: Rén Rénfā; Wade–Giles: Jen Jen-fa) (1254–1327), courtesy name Ziming (子明), pseudonym Yueshan Daoren (月山道人; lit. "Taoist on the Moon Mountain"), was an expert of irrigation works, artist, and a government official of the Yuan dynasty. He was born in Qinglong Town, Songjiang (松江青龙镇 – present day Qingpu District, Shanghai).

Ren drew some outstanding paintings of horses, people, flowers and birds. His style is similar to the artists of the Tang dynasty (608–907) and he is considered a direct successor to Li Gonglin (1049–1106) of the Northern Song dynasty. His paintings of horses are comparable to those by Zhao Mengfu.

Despite his position under alien Mongol emperors, Ren did not shy from producing works with a political subtext. His inscription on Fat and Lean Horses explains that the "fat horse represents the self-satisfied, wealthy official and the lean one the humble, poor, self-deprecating official."

Ren's hydrological works include dredging the area in what is now Beijing to improve the water supply and leading a team to build embankments after the Yellow River burst its banks.

== Coming out of the Stable ==
A prominent work of his is Chu Yu Tu (出圉图 – Coming out of the Stable); on silk, with color, height 32.4 cm, width 201.9 cm, currently in the collection of The Palace Museum, Beijing.

In this painting three officials of the royal stables are leading four horses out of the stable. The painting has a very explicit Tang style. The people in the painting are dressed in Tang style costumes. All these reflect that the artist admired the culture of the Tang dynasty. The people and horses are spread out in the painting, which is a main characteristic of paintings by Ren.

At the end of the painting (left side), there are some words about the artist and the year of painting. "On the third day of the second month of spring, 1280, [I] made Coming out of the Stable at the Keshi Hall. Recorded by Yueshan Ren Ziming." There is a poem written by the Qianlong Emperor (Qing dynasty, r. 1736–1795), who also added some notes in the middle of the painting. It is one of the earliest works of Ren (and the earliest one of his that exists), and was drawn in 1280 when he was 27.

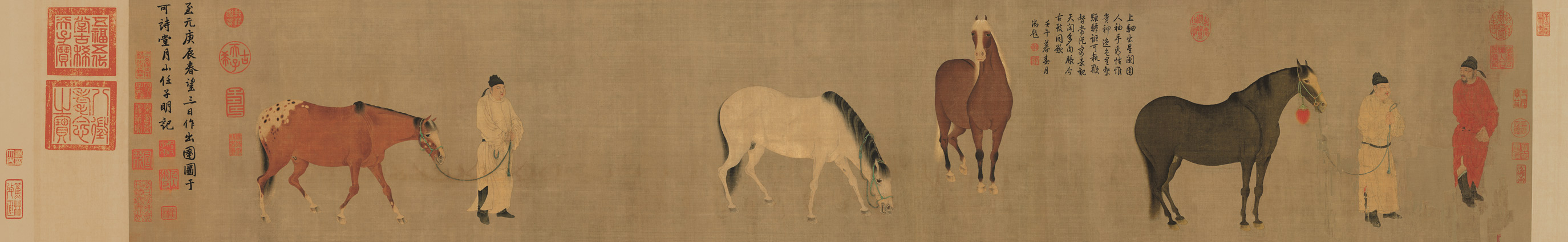
Ren Renfa, Coming out of the Stable

== Five Drunken Princes Returning on Horseback ==
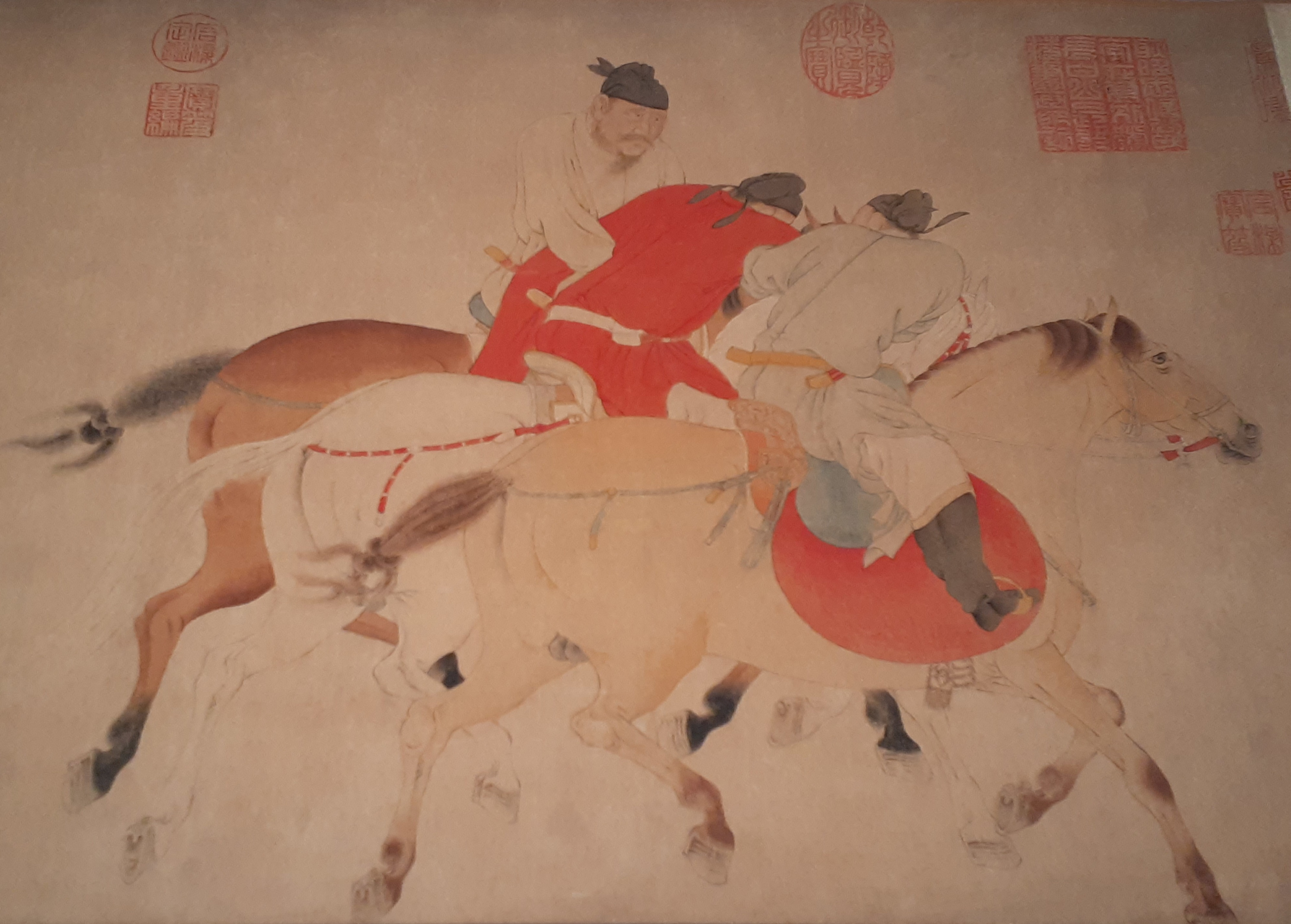
One of the titular "Five Drunken Princes" with two servants.

This 2-metre (6.6ft) scroll depicts five princes on horseback with four attendants. Among the princes is Li Longji, later the Emperor Xuanzong of the Tang dynasty. It was held in imperial collections and bears the seals of several emperors. The work was already held in high esteem by the Ming dynasty, as literati painter Zhang Ning (1426–1496) wrote: "Black, Yellow, Red, White, and Mottled Horses. Every horse is worth a thousand taels of gold."

In 1922, after the fall of Qing dynasty, the scroll was taken from the Forbidden City by Pu Yi, the last emperor of China.

In October 2020 it was sold at Sotheby's auctioneers in Hong Kong. After a 75-minute bidding battle, described by the auction house as "the longest in living memory", the hammer price was US$39,555,000. It was bought by the private Long Museum in Shanghai. The museum’s founder, Liu Yiqian, said that he was an underbidder at the previous auction in 2016. “It’s worth the wait for good items,” he said.
