= Chronology of the Northern Crusades =

This chronology presents the timeline of the Northern Crusades beginning with the 10th century establishment of Christian churches in northern Europe. These were primarily Christianization campaigns undertaken by the Christian kingdoms of Denmark, Norway and Sweden together with the Teutonic Knights, primarily against the pagan Baltic, Finnic and West Slavic peoples around the southern and eastern shores of the Baltic Sea.

== 10th century ==
- 960–990. Christian churches are established among West Slavs, Danes, Poles and Russians.
- 983. The Wends participate in the Slavic Revolt of 983 against the Holy Roman Empire under Otto the Great.
- 997. St. Adalbert of Prague is martyred in Prussia.

== 11th century ==
1000

- (Date unknown). Archdiocese of Gniezno is founded in Poland.

1045

- (Date unknown, as late as 1050). The cathedrals of Holy Wisdom, the Cathedral of St. Sophia in Novgorod and Saint Sophia Cathedral in Polotsk, are built.

1064

- (Date unknown). Gunther of Bamberg leads the Great German Pilgrimage of 1064–1065 to the Holy Land.

1066

- 10 November. Bishop John Scotus is killed during a Wendish revolt against Christianity.
- (Date unknown). Adam of Bremen writes his chronicle Gesta Hammaburgensis ecclesiae pontificum (Deeds of Bishops of the Hamburg Church).

1086

- 10 July. Canute IV of Denmark is martyred.

1088

- 12 March. Urban II is elected pope.

1093

- (Date unknown). A Christian coalition led by the Obotrite prince Henry and Magnus of Saxony defeats the Wends at the Battle of Schmilau.

1095

- 18 August. Eric I of Denmark becomes king.
- 17–27 November. At the Council of Clermont, Urban II issues a call for the First Crusade to reconquer the Holy Land for Christendom.

1099

- 7 June – 15 July. The Crusaders capture the Holy City after the Siege of Jerusalem.

== 12th Century ==
1103

- (Date unknown). Eric I of Denmark and his wife Boedil begin a pilgrimage to the Holy Land as described in the Knýtlinga saga. He would die in July on Cyprus, but she made it to Jerusalem where she died shortly thereafter.

1104

- (Date unknown). Niels of Denmark becomes king, succeeding his brother Eric I of Denmark, and campaigns against the Wends in an alliance with Poland.
- (Date unknown). The Archdiocese of Lund is established as the metropolitan of the North by Alberic of Ostia.

1106

- Approximate. Daniel of Kiev makes a pilgrimage to the Holy Land.

1107

- Autumn. The Norwegian Crusade led by Sigurd the Crusader begins with attacks on Iberia.

1108

- (Date unknown). The Archbishopric of Magdeburg calls for war against the Wends.

1109

- (Date uncertain, 1108 or 1109). Sigurd the Crusader attacks Formentera in the Balearic Islands.

1116

- (Date unknown). Novgorod and Pskov begin an expedition against Tartu and the fortress of Otepää.

1119

- 1 February. Callixtus II becomes pope.
- (Date unknown). Hugues de Payens founds the Knights Templar and becomes its first Grand Master.

1120

- (Date unknown). Callixtus II issues the papal bull Sicut Judaeis laying out the Church's position on Jews.

1124

- June–August. Sigurd the Crusader conducts the Kalmar Expedition, a leidang to Christianize the region of Småland. This is the first of the Northern Crusades.
- (Date unknown). Otto of Bamberg begins the Christianization of Pomerania.

1128

- (Date unknown). The Santa Maria Alemanna (Church of Saint Mary of the Germans) is founded in Jerusalem.

1130

- 14 February. Innocent II becomes pope.

1134

- 4 June. Beginning a series of the Danish Civil Wars, Eric II of Denmark defeats Niels of Denmark and Magnus the Strong at the Battle of Fotevik and becomes king on 25 June.
- (Date unknown). The Saxons erect the castle of Segeberg.

1135

- (Date unknown). Eric II of Denmark defeats the Lechites under Ratibor I of Pomerania in a naval battle off the coast of Denmark.

1136

- Summer. Danish forces under Eric II of Denmark attack Slavic Rügen, taking its capital Arkona.

1137

- 18 September. Eric III of Denmark becomes king after the death of his uncle Eric II of Denmark.

1143

- (Date unknown). Henry the Lion grants the Slavic lands of Wagria and Polabia to Saxon counts.

1144

- (Date unknown). During the reign of Sverker I of Sweden, the Cistercians establish Catholic abbeys in Sweden and Denmark at the invitation of queen Ulvhild Håkansdotter.

1145

- 15 February. Eugene III becomes pope.
- 1 December. Eugene III issues the papal bull Quantum praedecessores calling for the Second Crusade.
- 25 December. Louis VII of France declares his intention at Bourges to support the crusade.

1146

- 1 March. The reissue of papal bull Quantum praedecessores allows Bernard of Clairvaux to preach the crusade throughout Europe.
- 31 March. Louis VII of France and his wife Eleanor of Aquitaine take the cross and lead the French forces of the crusade.
- Before August. Eric III of Denmark abdicates and the throne of Denmark is contested between Sweyn III of Denmark and Canute V of Denmark.
- 5 October. Eugene III issues the first part of the papal bull Divina dispensatione urging Italians to join the Second Crusade.
- 24 December. Conrad III of Germany and Frederick Barbarossa take the cross and lead the German forces of the crusade.

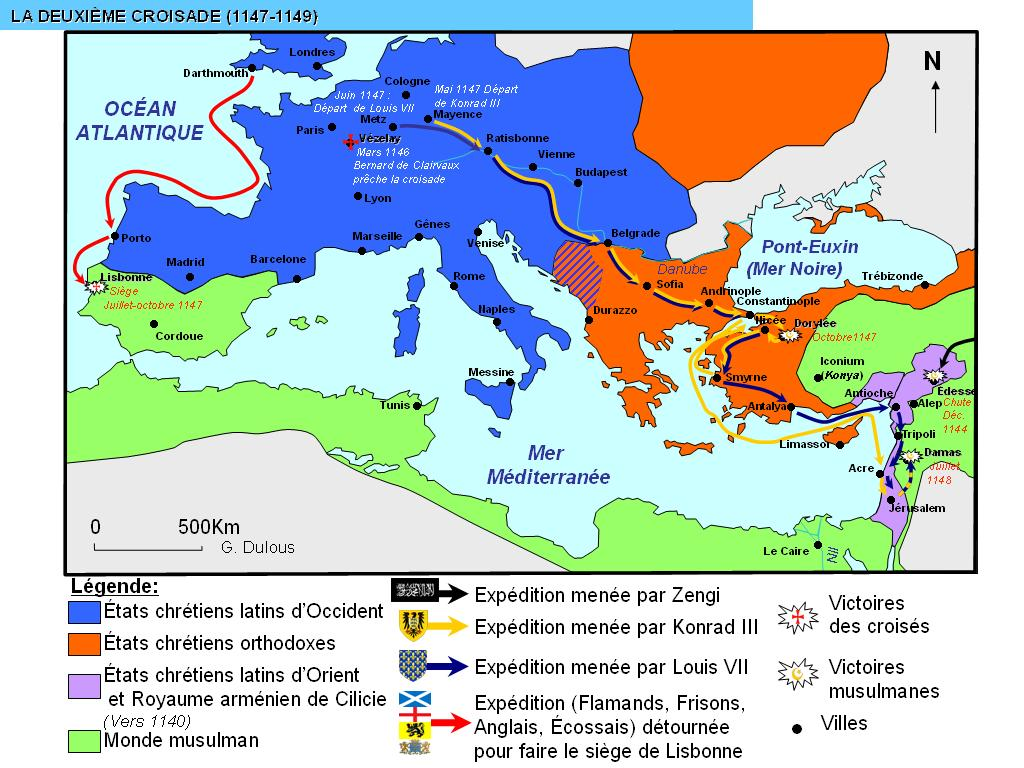
Map of the Second Crusade.

1147

- 11 April. The second part of the papal bull Divina dispensatione is issued, calling for the Wendish Crusade against the Polabian Slavs.
- Later. In response, Christian forces are assembled including Saxons under Albert the Bear and Henry the Lion and Danes under Canute V of Denmark and Sweyn III of Denmark assemble.
- 26 June. The Wendish Crusade begins as the Wends under Slavic prince Niklot sack Lübeck.
- October. The Christian forces of the Wendish Crusade led by Anselm of Havelberg withdraw after the Danes are defeated and the crusade is abandoned by the Saxons.

1148

- 28 July. The Crusader commanders retreat to Jerusalem, ending the Second Crusade.

1151

- (Date unknown). Danish nobleman Wetheman founds a lay confraternity in Roskilde organized into leidang to help fight the Wends.
- (Date unknown). Rognvald Kali Kolsson begins his pilgrimage to the Holy Land as documented in the Orkneyinga saga.

1152

- (Date unknown). Clergyman and historian John of Salisbury writes his Historia Pontificalis quae Supersunt, covering the years 1148–1152.

1156

- 21 December. Erik IX of Sweden becomes king.

1157

- Approximate. Erik IX of Sweden conducts an expedition to Finland in the (likely mythical) First Swedish Crusade.

1157

- July. Valdemar I of Denmark, Sweyn III of Denmark and Canute V of Denmark agree to jointly rule Denmark.
- 23 October. Sweyn III of Denmark is defeated by Valdemar I of Denmark in the last phase of the Danish Civil Wars, culminating in the Battle of Grathe Heath.

1159

- 7 September. Alexander III becomes pope.

1160

- 18 May. Magnus II of Sweden becomes king after murdering Erik I of Sweden.
- June. Henry the Lion begins his conquest of the Wends.
- (Date unknown). The Obotrites are attacked by Saxons and Danes, resulting in the death of the Obotrite prince Niklot, and the partition of the Obotrite lands.

1161

- (Date unknown). Charles VII of Sweden becomes king after killing his predecessor Magnus II of Sweden.

1162

- 6 July. The Slavic duchy of Demmin is taken by Henry the Lion.

1163

- (Date unknown). Pribislav of Mecklenburg rises in revolt against the Saxons.

1164

- 6 July. The army of Henry the Lion, assisted by the fleet of Valdemar the Great, defeat the West Slavic Obotrites at the Battle of Verchen.
- (Date unknown). The Archbishopric of Uppsala is created in Sweden.

1167

- 12 April. Canute I of Sweden becomes king.

1168

- (Date unknown, through 1169). Valdemar I of Denmark defeats the Wends at the Siege of Arkona.

1170

- (Date unknown). Danish forces led by Valdemar I of Denmark and Absalon defeat those of Casimir I of Pomerania and Bogisław I of Pomerania at the Battle of Julin Bridge.

1171

- 11 September. Alexander III issues the papal bull Non parum animus noster to promote the Northern Crusades against the pagan Estonians and Finns.
- (Date unknown). Saxon priest Helmold of Bosau writes his Chronica Sclavorum (Chronicle of the Slavs) of the northwestern Slavic tribes up to 1171.

1172

- June–July. Henry the Lion takes a pilgrimage to Jerusalem.

1179

- March. Alexander III presides over the Third Council of the Lateran.

1180

- 13 January. Henry the Lion is stripped of his imperial fiefs at an Imperial Diet in Würzburg for having breached the peace of Frederick Barbarossa.

1181

- November. Henry the Lion is deposed and exiled.
- (Date unknown). The Kingdom of Denmark defeats the Scanian rebels at the Battle of Dösjebro.

1182

- 12 May. Canute VI of Denmark becomes king after the death of his father Valdemar I of Denmark.

1184

- 4 November. Pope Lucius III issues the papal bull Ad abolendam after the Synod of Verona, conducted with emperor Frederick Barbarossa, condemning heretics and calling for a new crusade to the Holy Land.

1185

- 25 November. Urban III becomes pope.
- (Date unknown). A failed raid of Igor Svyatoslavich against the Polovtsians (possibly fictional) is described in The Tale of Igor's Campaign.
- (Date unknown, may be 1186). Canute VI of Denmark invades Pomerania and forces Bogisław I of Pomerania to acknowledge him as overlord. Canute and his successor monarchs of Denmark then used the title King of the Wends.

1187

- 12 August. Estonians, Curonians or/and Karelians destroy the Swedish town during the Pillage of Sigtuna.
- 20 October. Urban III dies and is succeeded by Gregory VIII on 25 October.
- 29 October. Gregory VIII issues the bull Audita tremendi calling for the Third Crusade.
- (Date unknown). Chieftain Esbern the Resolute calls for Danish support of the Third Crusade.
- (Date unknown). Canute I of Sweden repels a fleet of pagan Karelians ravaging coastal towns. He builds a defensive tower in Stockholm in response.

1188

- (Date unknown). Estonians raid Upsalla. First mission to the Livs.

1191

- 30 March. Celestine III becomes pope.
- 15 April. Henry VI of Germany becomes Holy Roman Emperor.
- (Date unknown). Canute VI leads a crusade to Finland.

1192

- (Date unknown). The Teutonic Knights are recognized by Celestine III.

1193

- (Date unknown). Celestine III calls for a crusades in Spain and in Northern Europe.

1194

- Spring. Polish High Duke Casimir II the Just organizes an expedition against the Baltic Yotvingians.

1195

- (Date unknown). Sverker II of Sweden becomes king.

1198

- 8 January. Innocent III becomes pope.
- August. The Livonian Crusades begin with the Wars against Livs and Latgalians. Berthold of Hanover fails to defeat the Livonians and is killed.

== 13th century ==
1200

- (Date unknown). Albert of Buxhoeveden, bishop of Riga, leads a crusade to conquer Latvia.

1202

- 12 November. Valdemar II of Denmark becomes king upon the death of his brother Canute VI of Denmark.
- (Date unknown). Anders Sunesen leads a crusade against the Finns as part of the Danish Crusade.
- (Date unknown). The Livonian Brothers of the Sword is established.

1204

- Late. Innocent III authorizes those who took a crusading vow but could not go may crusade in the Baltic instead.

1207

- 2 February. Terra Mariana (Old Livonia) is established as a vassal state of the Holy See.

1208

- (Date unknown). Erik X of Sweden becomes king after defeating Sverker II of Sweden at the Battle of Lena.

1215

- 11 November. Innocent III consecrates the Cistercian monk, Christian of Oliva, as bishop of the Prussians at the Fourth Council of the Lateran.

1216

- 10 April. John I of Sweden becomes king, the last of the House of Sverker.
- 18 July. Honorius III becomes pope.

1217

- 21 September. The Livonian Brothers of the Sword defeat the Estonians at the Battle of St. Matthew's Day.

1218

- March. Honorius III authorizes the Prussian Crusade.

1219

- Early. Valdemar II of Denmark invades Estonia, which is elevated to a crusade by Honorius III, and takes Tallinn (Revel).
- 19 June. The forces of Valdemar II of Denmark defeat the Estonians at the Battle of Lyndanisse.

1220

- 8 August. The Estonians defeat the invading Swedes at the Battle of Lihula, ending their aggression for centuries.
- 22 November. Frederick II and Constance of Aragon are crowned Holy Roman Emperor and Empress by Honorius III, taking the cross for the second time.

1221

- (Date unknown). A Kievan Rus' force fails to defeat the Seljuk Turks under Kayqubad I at the Battle of Sudak.
- (Date unknown). An Estonian force fails to take the city from the Danes in the Siege of Tallinn.

1222

- 10 March. Eric XI of Sweden becomes king.

1225

- (Date unknown). William of Modena begins his first legation to the East Baltic churches.
- (Date unknown). Icelandic historian Snorri Sturluson writes his Heimskringla concerning Scandinavian involvement in the Northern Crusades.

1226

- March. Frederick II issues the Golden Bull of Rimini granting Prussia to the Teutonic Knights.
- (Date unknown). The Teutonic Knights undertake a new crusade to subdue the pagan Prussians.

1227

- January. The Livonian Brothers of the Sword and their allies defeat the last Estonian strongholds in the Battle of Muhu.
- 19 March. Gregory IX becomes pope.
- 22 July. Holstein forces defeat Valdemar II of Denmark and Otto the Child at the Battle of Bornhöved.
- (Date unknown). Henry of Latvia writes his Livonian Chronicle.

1229

- (Date unknown). Canute II of Sweden becomes king.
- (Date unknown). Gregory IX confirms the creation of the Order of Dobrzyń.
- (Date uncertain). The Livonian Chronicle of Henry is written by the priest Henry of Latvia.

1230

- 16 June. The Treaty of Kruschwitz is signed granting the lands of Chełmno to the Teutonic Knights.
- October. The Teutonic Knights occupy Chelmno Land and begin their conquest of Prussia as authorized by Gregory IX.

1233

- (Date unknown). The papal attacks on heretics in the Stedinger Crusade begin and are finally successful in 1234.

1234

- 3 August. Pietati proximum, or the Golden Bull of Reiti, is issued by Gregory IX, confirming the occupation of Prussia by the Teutonic Knights.
- (Date unknown). Eric XI of Sweden overthrows Canute II of Sweden to regain the Swedish throne.

1236

- 22 September. Pagan troops of Samogitians and Semigallians defeat the Livonian Brothers of the Sword at Battle of Saule.
- Winter. The Tavastian uprising in Finland is suppressed by Sweden.
- (Date unknown). Mindaugas becomes the first Grand Duke of Lithuania.

1237

- (Date unknown). The Livonian Brothers of the Sword are incorporated into the Teutonic Knights and becomes known as the Livonian Order. Their first master was Hermann Balk.

1240

- 15 July. In the beginning of the Swedish–Novgorodian Wars, the Novgorods defeats the Kingdom of Sweden at the Battle of the Neva.
- Winter. The 1240–1241 Votia campaign begins.
- (Date unknown). The Teutonic Knights of the Livonian Order are unsuccessful in their Livonian campaign against Rus'.

1241

- The winter 1240–1241 Votia campaign is initially a success for the Oeselian–Livonian–Votian alliance, but the Novgorodians react by driving them out of Koporye.
- 28 March. Eric IV of Denmark becomes king upon the death of his father Valdemar II of Denmark.

1242

- 12 April. The forces of the Republic of Novgorod led by Alexander Nevsky defeat the forces of the Livonian Order at the Battle on the Ice. As a result, the Teutonic Knights drop all territorial claims over Russian lands.

1243

- 25 June. Innocent IV becomes pope.
- 23 September. Innocent IV issues the papal bull Qui iustis causis authorizing crusades in Prussia and Livonia.

1248

- (Date unknown). Birger Jarl becomes Jarl of Sweden under Eric XI of Sweden.

1249

- 2 February. The Treaty of Christburg is signed between the pagan Prussian clans, represented by a papal legate, and the Teutonic Knights. It marks the end of the First Prussian Uprising.
- 29 November. The Prussians defeat the Teutonic Knights at the Battle of Krücken.
- Approximate. The Tavastians are defeated in the Second Swedish Crusade led by Birger Jarl. This begins the period of Finland under Swedish rule.

1250

- 2 February. Valdemar of Sweden becomes king.
- 1 November. Abel of Denmark becomes king.
- 13 December. Frederick II dies and the Holy Roman Empire enters the Great Interregnum.

1252

- 15 May. Innocent IV issues the papal bull Ad exstirpanda, which authorizes the torture of heretics in the Inquisition.
- 29 June. Christopher I of Denmark becomes king.

1253

- 6 July. Grand Duke Mindaugas is crowned King of Lithuania.

1254

- (Date unknown). The conquest of Samland by the Teutonic Knights begins, to be completed in two years. Its capital was Königsberg, named after Ottokar II of Bohemia.

1259

- 29 May. Eric V of Denmark becomes king.

1260

- 13 July. The Samogitians defeat the joint forces of the Teutonic Knights and the Livonian Order at the Battle of Durbe. Livonian master Burkhard von Hornhausen is killed.
- 20 September. The Great Prussian Uprising begins.

1261

- 22 January. The Prussians defeat the Teutonic Knights at the Battle of Pokarwis.
- 29 August. Urban IV becomes pope. He previously worked to negotiate the Treaty of Christburg.

1264

- (Date unknown). The Teutonic Knights repel the Prussians at the Siege of Bartenstein.

1265

- 5 February. Clement IV become pope.

1268

- 18 February. The combined forces of Danish Estonia and the Livonian Order engage the forces of Novgorod and Pskov at the inconclusive Battle of Wesenberg.

1271

- 1 September. Gregory X is elected pope and preaches new crusade in coordination with the Mongols.
- (Date unknown). The Teutonic Knights and the Prussians fight to a stalemant in the Battle of Pagastin.

1273

- 1 October. Rudolf I of Germany is elected king, ending the Great Interregnum.

1275

- (Date unknown). Magnus III Ladulås becomes king of Sweden.

1279

- 5 March. The Teutonic Knights are defeated by Grand Duchy of Lithuania at the Battle of Aizkraukle.

1281

- 22 February. Martin IV is elected pope.

1283

- Summer. The Prussian rebellion against the Teutonic Knights collapses.

1285

- Winter. The Teutonic Knights launch the Lithuanian Crusade.

1286

- 22 November. Eric VI of Denmark becomes king.

1288

- 22 February. Nicholas IV becomes pope, immediately supporting a crusade to the Holy Land.

1290

- 18 December. Birger of Sweden becomes king.
- (Date unknown). The conquest of Semigallia by the Livonian Order is completed.

1292

- (Date unknown). The Swedes establish the outpost of Viborg (Viipuru) in Karelia.

1293

- (Date unknown). Viborg Castle established in Finland as part of the Third Swedish Crusade led by Torkel Knutsson.

1294

- 24 December. Boniface VIII elected pope.

1298

- 1 June. Forces of the Livonian Order are decisively defeated by the residents of Riga, allied with the Grand Duchy of Lithuania under Vytenis at the Battle of Turaida.
- 28 June. The Livonians and the Teutonic Order defeat Riga and Lithuania near Neuermühlen, capturing Riga.

1299

- (Date uncertain). The Livonian Rhymed Chronicle is written.

== 14th century ==
1300

- (Date unknown). Swedes under Tyrgils Knutsson lead an attack against the Novgorodians and establish an outpost at Landskrona.

1308

- 1 May. Albert I of Germany assassinated, Henry of Luxembourg crowned king of Germany (later to become Holy Roman Emperor as Henry VII).
- 13 November. Teutonic Knights takeover Gdańsk, beginning a long-running conflict between the State of the Teutonic Order and the Kingdom of Poland.
- 27 November. Henry of Luxembourg elected Holy Roman Emperor, confirmed by Clement V in July 1309 and crowned at Candlemas 1312.

1309

- March. Avignon Papacy begins.
- 13 September. Treaty of Soldin provides legal basis for the Teuton occupation of Gdańsk.
- (Date unknown). Teutonic Knights move their headquarters from Venice to Malbork Castle in Marienburg.

1311

- 7 April. The Teutonic Knights defeat Lithuania at the Battle of Wopławki.

1312

- 29 June. Henry VII becomes Holy Roman Emperor, ending the Great Interregnum.

1315

- (Date unknown). The Great famine of 1315–1317 devastates Europe.

1319

- 8 July. Magnus II Eriksson becomes king of Sweden and Norway.
- 13 November. Eric VI of Denmark dies and his brother Christopher II of Denmark becomes king the next year.

1320

- (Not earlier than). Erik's Chronicle is written, the oldest surviving Swedish chronicle,

1323

- 12 August. The Treaty of Nöteborg is signed between Sweden and the Novgorod Republic regulating their border.

1324

- 6 July. Werner von Orseln becomes Grand Master of the Teutonic Knights.

1326

- 10 February. The Polish–Teutonic War begins with the 8-week Raid on Brandenburg by Polish-Lithuanian forces against Louis IV the Bavarian, protector of the Teutons, leaving the area devastated.
- 3 June. The Treaty of Novgorod is signed, marking the end of decades of the Norwegian-Novgorodian border skirmishes in the far-northern region of Finnmark.

1329

- 1 February. The Siege of Medvėgalis by the Teutonic Knights and John of Bohemia results in the capture of a Lithuanian fortress in Samogitia.

=== 1330 ===
- 18 November. Grand Master Werner von Orseln dies after an assassination attempt.

1331

- 17 February. Lothar of Brunswick is elected Grand Master of the Teutonic Knights.
- 27 September. The Teutonic Knights are defeated by Poland at the Battle of Płowce.

1334

- 20 December. Benedict XII elected pope.

1340

- 24 June. Valdemar IV of Denmark becomes king.

1342

- 7 May. The Archbishop of Rouen elected pope, taking the name Clement VI.

1343

- 8 July. The Polish–Teutonic War concludes with the Treaty of Kalisz signed by the principals Casimir III the Great and Ludolf König von Wattzau.

1346

- (Date unknown). Valdemar IV of Denmark sells Estonia to the Teutonic Knights.

1348

- 2 February. The Teutonic Knights defeat Lithuania at the Battle of Strėva.
- (Date unknown). Magnus IV of Sweden leads the Crusade against Novgorod, capturing the fortress of Orekhov. Magnus withdraws in 1351.

1352

- 18 December. Innocent VI elected pope.

1355

- 4 April. Charles IV of Luxembourg is crowned Holy Roman Emperor.

1362

- 13 March – 17 April. The Teutonic Knights defeat Lithuania at the Siege of Kaunas.
- 22 September. Urban V elected pope.

1363

- 31 March. Urban V proclaims a crusade and grants the signum crucis to Peter I of Cyprus and John II of France, to start not later than 1 March 1365. This is extended to Lithuania the next year.

1364

- (Date unknown). Albert of Sweden becomes king.

1365

- 12 April. Urban V issues a passagium generale for the Crusade of Peter I of Cyprus.

1370

- 18 February. The Teutonic Knights defeat Lithuania at the Battle of Rudau.
- 30 December. Gregory XI elected pope.

1376

- 3 May. Olaf II of Denmark becomes king.

1378

- 8 April. Urban VI elected pope, preaches crusade against Joanna I of Naples.
- 20 September. Thirteen cardinals reject Urban VI as pope, and elect Clement VII as antipope, beginning the Great Schism within the Catholic Church.

=== 1380 ===
- 31 May. Jogaila signs the Treaty of Dovydiškės with the Teutonic Knights, sparking a civil war with his uncle Kęstutis.
- 8 September. Russian forces under Grand Prince Dmitry Donskoy stop aninvasion by the Blue Horde at the Battle of Kulikovo.

1381

- August. The First Lithuanian Civil War begins.

1384

- 16 November. Ten-year-old Jadwiga of Poland is crowned in Kraków following the death of her father Louis I of Hungary in 1382.

1386

- 4 March. Jogaila marries Jadwiga and is crowned Władysław II Jagiełło beginning the Jagiellonian dynasty of Poland.

1387

- 10 August. Margaret I of Denmark becomes queen of Denmark.

1388

- 2 February. Margaret I of Denmark becomes queen of Norway.

1389

- 24 February. Margaret I of Denmark becomes queen of Sweden.
- (Date unknown). The Second Lithuanian Civil War begins.

1390

- 19 January. The Treaty of Lyck between Vytautas and the Teutonic Knights signed.
- 26 May. The Treaty of Königsberg is signed between Samogitian nobles and the Teutonic Knights.
- (Date unknown). The Eric Chronicle is written.

1397

- 17 June. Eric of Pomerania becomes ruler of the Kalmar Union of Denmark, Norway and Sweden, ruling with his great-aunt Margaret I of Denmark. This union would last until 1523.

1398

- 12 October. Treaty of Salynas is signed by Vytautas and Konrad von Jungingen in an attempt to cede Samogitiato the Teutonic Knights.

== 15th century ==
1404

- 17 October. Innocent VII elected pope.

1409

- 6 August. The Polish–Lithuanian–Teutonic War begins.

=== 1410 ===
- 15 July. At the Battle of Grunwald, allies Władysław II Jagiełło and Vytautas defeat the Teutonic Knights under Ulrich von Jungingen, with most of their leadership killed or taken prisoner.
- 26 July. After Grunwald, the Poles and Lithuanians unsuccessfully attempt to take the Teuton's capital in the Siege of Marienburg.

1411

- 1 February. The Peace of Thorn is signed ending the Polish–Lithuanian–Teutonic War.

1414

- Summer. The Hunger War is conducted between Poland and Lithuania against the Teutonic Knights.

1417

- 11 November. Martin V elected pope, ending the Great Schism of 1378–1417.

1422

- 17 July – 27 September. The Teutonic Knights are defeated by Poland and Lithuania in the Gollub War, ending with the signing of the Treaty of Melno.

1431

- 11 March. Eugene IV elected pope.
- 16 June. The Teutonic Knights and Grand Duke Švitrigaila sign the Treaty of Christmemel creating an anti-Polish alliance.
- (Date unknown). The Polish–Teutonic War begins.

1432

- 31 August. The Lithuanian Civil War begins.

1433

- 31 May. Sigismund is crowned Holy Roman Emperor, becoming the first emperor since the death of his father Charles IV in 1378.

1435

- 1 September. Sigismund Kęstutaitis decisively defeats Grand Duke Švitrigaila at the Battle of Wiłkomierz.
- 1 December. Peace of Brześć Kujawski signed, ending the Polish–Teutonic War.

=== 1440 ===
- 1 February. The Prussian Confederation is formed to oppose the Teutonic Knights.
- 9 April. Christopher of Bavaria becomes king of Denmark.

1441

- 13 September. Christopher of Bavaria is crowned King of Sweden.

1442

- 13 September. Christopher of Bavaria is crowned King of Norway.

1448

- 1 September. Christian I of Denmark becomes king of Denmark.

1450

- 13 May. Christian I of Denmark becomes king of Norway.

1454

- 4 February. The Thirteen Years' War between Poland and the Teutonic Knights begins.
- 6 March. Casimir IV of Poland renounces allegiance to the Teutonic Knights.
- 18 September. Bernhard von Zinnenberg leads the Teutonic Knights to a victory over Casimir IV of Poland at the Battle of Chojnice.

1457

- 23 June. 1 September. Christian I of Denmark becomes king of Sweden.

1462

- 17 September. Poland defeats the Teutonic Knights at the Battle of Świecino, part of the Thirteen Years' War.

1463

- 15 September. The Prussian Confederation defeats the Teutonic Knights in the naval Battle of Vistula Lagoon (Zatoka Świeża).

1466

- 19 October. The Thirteen Years' War ends with the second Peace of Toruń.

1470

- 1 June. Sten Sture becomes regent of Sweden.

1471

- 14 July. Muscovy defeats the Novgorods at the Battle of Shelon.
- 9 August. Sixtus IV elected pope and issues a papal bull authorizing the creation of Uppsala University.

1478

- (Date unknown) Ivan III of Russia conquers the Republic of Novgorod.

1481

- 21 May. John of Denmark becomes king of Denmark.

1483

- 20 July. John of Denmark is crowned King of Norway.

1491

- 24 January. Poland and Lithuania defeat the Crimean Khanate under Meñli I Giray at the Battle of Zasław.

1492

- 26 October. Stephan the Great defeats John I of Poland at the Battle of the Cosmin Forest.

1496

- (Date unknown). Sweden conquers Ivangorod.

1497

- 6 October. John of Denmark becomes king of Sweden.
- (Date unknown). The Moldavian Campaign was an unsuccessful attack by John Albert of Poland on Moldavia, supported by the Ottomans, with the objective of deposing Stephen the Great. This would last two years.

== 16th century ==
1501

- 21 June. The Treaty of Wenden unites the Livonians and Lithuanians against Ivan III of Russia.

1502

- (Date unknown). Alexander Jagiellon signs a five-year treaty with Bayezid II, the first of the Polish-Ottoman alliances.

1506

- 6 August. Lithuania defeats the Crimean Khanate at the Battle of Kletsk.

1508

- 4 February. Maximillian I of Germany becomes Holy Roman Emperor.

1510

- 14 December. Albert of Brandenburg-Ansbach becomes Grand Master of the Teutonic Knights.

1514

- 8 September. Lithuania defeats the Principality of Moscow at the Battle of Orsha.

1519

- (Date unknown). Poland invades Prussia.

1525

- 8 April. The Treaty of Kraków is signed between Poland and the Teutonic Knights, ended the Polish–Teutonic War.
- (Date unknown). Albert of Prussia secularizes Prussia.

1561

- (Date unknown). Livonia is secularized and partitioned.

== Bibliography ==
- Berry, Virginia G. (1969). "The Second Crusade" ( (PDF)). The First Hundred Years. Univ of Wisconsin Press. pp. 463–512. ISBN 978-0-299-04834-1. Archived from the original on 2023-03-26.
- Bryce, James (1892). The Holy Roman Empire. London, Macmillan and co.
- Christiansen, Eric (1997). The Northern Crusades. Penguin Books. ISBN 9780140266535.
- Davies, Brian L. (2007). Warfare, State and Society on the Black Sea Steppe, 1500–1700. Routledge. ISBN 9780415239851.
- Fonnesberg-Schmidt, Iben (2007). The Popes and the Baltic Crusades, 1147–1254 (PDF). Brill. ISBN 9789004155022.
- Frost, Robert (2015). The Oxford History of Poland-Lithuania. Oxford University Press. ISBN 9780191746345.
- Galeotti, Mark (2019). Kulikova 1380: The Battle that Made Russia. Bloomsbury USA. ISBN 978-1-4728-3121-7.
- Housley, Norman (1992). The Later Crusades, 1274-1580: From Lyons to Alcazar. Oxford University Press. ISBN 9780198221371.
- Kiaupa, Zigmantas (2000). The History of Lithuania before 1795. Lithuanian Institute of History. ISBN 9789986810131.
- Lind, John H. (2006a). "Finland". In Murray, Alan V. (ed.). The Crusades—An Encyclopedia. ABC-CLIO. pp. 436–439. ISBN 9781576078624.
- Lind, John H. (2006b). "Sweden". In Murray, Alan V. (ed.). The Crusades—An Encyclopedia. ABC-CLIO. pp. 1126–1130. ISBN 9781576078624.
- Lock, Peter (2006). The Routledge Companion to the Crusades. Routledge. doi:10.4324/9780203389638. ISBN 9780415393126.
- Luke, Harry (1975a). The Kingdom of Cyprus, 1291–1369 (PDF). A History of the Crusades (Setton), Volume III.
- Mänd, Anu; Tamm, Marek (2020). Making Livonia: Actors and Networks in the Medieval and Early Modern Baltic Sea Region. Routledge. ISBN 9781000076936.
- Martin, Janet (2007). Medieval Russia: 980–1584. Second Edition. E-book. Cambridge: Cambridge University Press. ISBN 9780511368004.
- Murray, Alan V. (2006). The Crusades—An Encyclopedia. ABC-CLIO. ISBN 9781576078624.
- Murray, Alan V. (2009). The Clash of Cultures on the Medieval Baltic Frontier. Ashgate. ISBN 9780754664833.
- Pilat, Liviu (2017). The Ottoman Threat and Crusading on the Eastern Border of Christendom During the 15th Century. Brill. ISBN 9789004353800.
- Plum, Harry Grant (1906). The Teutonic Order and its Secularization. Iowa university, Bulletin, 1906 new series,no. 128. University of Iowa City.
- Riley-Smith, Jonathan (1998). The Atlas of the Crusades. Facts on File. ISBN 9780816021864.
- Runciman, Steven (1952). A History of the Crusades, Volume Two: The Kingdom of Jerusalem and the Frankish East, 1100–1187. Cambridge University Press. ISBN 9780521347716.
- Runciman, Steven (1969). "The First Crusade: Antioch to Ascalon" (PDF). The First Hundred Years. Univ of Wisconsin Press. pp. 308–342. ISBN 978-0-299-04834-1.
- Selart, Anti (2015). "Chapter 3: Livonia and Rus' in the 1230s and 1240s". Livonia, Rus' and the Baltic Crusades in the Thirteenth Century. Leiden/Boston: Brill. pp. 127–170. ISBN 9789004284753.
- Shirogorov, Vladimir (2021). War on the Eve of Nations: Conflicts and Militaries in Eastern Europe, 1450–1500. Lexington Books. ISBN 9781793622419.
- Stone, Daniel (2001). The Polish-Lithuanian State 1386-1795. University of Washington Press. ISBN 9780295980935.
- Turnbull, Stephen (2005). Tannenberg, 1410: Disaster for the Teutonic Knights. Praeger. ISBN 9780275988609.
- Tyerman, Christopher (2006). God's War: A New History of the Crusades. Belknap Press. ISBN 9780674023871.
- Urban, William L. (1975). The Baltic Crusade. Northern Illinois University Press. ISBN 9780875800523.
- Urban, William L. (1980). The Prussian Crusade. University of Michigan. ISBN 9780819112781.
- Urban, William L. (1999). Tannenberg and After: Lithuania, Poland, and the Teutonic Order in Search of Immortality. Lithuanian Research and Studies Center. ISBN 9780929700250.
- Urban, William L. (2003). The Teutonic Knights. Greenhill. ISBN 9781853675355.
- Urban, William L. (2006). The Samogitian Crusade. Lithuanian Research and Studies Center. ISBN 9780929700038.
- Venning, Timothy; Frankopan, Peter (2015). A Chronology of the Crusades. Taylor & Francis. ISBN 9781317496434.
- Woodhouse, F. C. (1879). Teutonic Knights. In The Military Religious Orders of the Middle Ages.
- Wyatt, Walter James (1876). The History of Prussia from the Earliest Yimes to the Present Day. London, Longmans, Green and Co.
