= 1240 Izborsk and Pskov campaign =

Military conflict involving Bishopric of Dorpat, the Livonian Order, and Pskov Land

Date	September 1240 (Note: "[T]he campaign against Pskov took place in September (...); in Livonia the second half of the summer was (...) the usual period for military campaigns.")
Location	Pskov Land (present-day Pskov Oblast)
Result	Livonian victory

Belligerents
Teutonic Order; Livonian Order; Bishopric of Dorpat; Yaroslav Vladimirovich	Pro-Suzdalian Novgorodians and Pskovians	City of Pskov

Commanders and leaders
Hermann of Dorpat Yaroslav Vladimirovich	Gavrilo Gorislavich †	Tverdilo Ivankovich

The Izborsk and Pskov campaign was a military conflict occurring in September 1240 in the Pskov Land. An alliance of the Bishopric of Dorpat, the Livonian Order (the former Livonian Brothers of the Sword, which had recently been incorporated into the Teutonic Order), and the pretender-prince Yaroslav Vladimirovich of Pskov besieged and conquered the Pskovian border fortress of Izborsk. After Pskovian defenders failed to retake the town, the allied forces advanced to the capital Pskov itself, compelling it to surrender.

The campaign resulted in the brief overthrow of the pro-Suzdalian faction that supported prince Aleksandr "Nevsky" Yaroslavich, and saw the installation of a new complex set of alliances. The situation ended after two years, when Nevsky led Novgorodian troops to retake Pskov under his family's control in spring 1242, and defeated the Dorpat–Livonian coalition at Lake Peipus.

== Background ==
In September 1236, a coalition of Sword Brothers, Pskovians, Livonians and Latgallians were utterly defeated in the Battle of Saule against the pagan Samogitians and Semigallians. Grandmaster Volkwin was killed, and the Sword Brothers were so devastated that in May 1237, they agreed to reorganise under Hermann Balk as the Livonian Order, a branch of their long-time rival, the Teutonic Order. In December 1237, Pope Gregory IX proclaimed the second crusade against Finland. On 7 June 1238, the Treaty of Stensby was signed between king Valdemar II of Denmark and the joint Masters of the Order: they agreed to divide Estonia and share future territorial conquests. After northern Estonia was thus restored to the Danish king, the Livonian Rhymed Chronicle (LRC) narrates that bishop Hermann of Dorpat was attacked by the Rus', who reportedly "had done him much harm". He requested aid from the Teutonic Knights, as well as some of "the [Danish] king's men".

== Izborsk and Pskov campaign ==
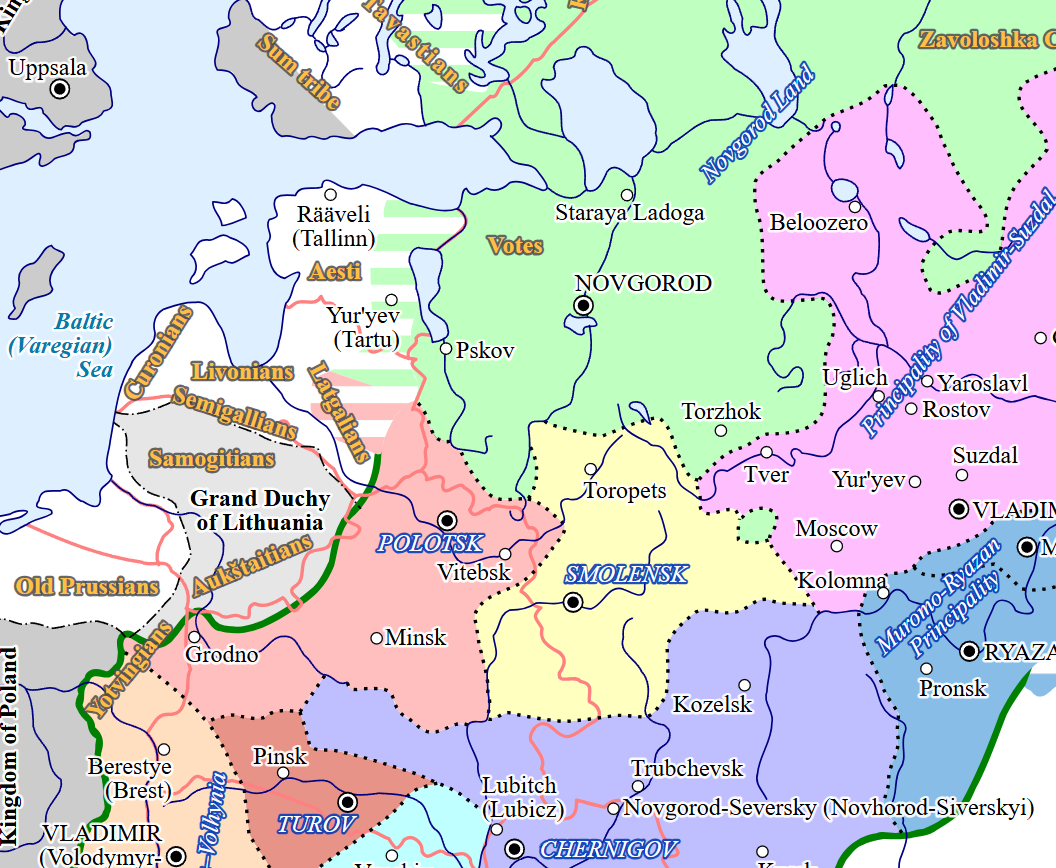
Situation in 1237: Livonia (various factions) Lithuania (pagan) Novgorod Republic (with Pskov) Suzdalia (Yurievichi clan) Smolensk (Rostislavichi clan) Chernigov (Olgovichi clan)

The Novgorod First Chronicle (NPL) reports that, after the Battle of the Neva (dated to July 1240), "the Nemtsy ("Germans") with the men of Medvezhya [Golova] (Odenpäh / Otepää), of Yurev (Dorpat / Tartu), and of Velyad (Fellin / Viljandi) with Knyaz Yaroslav Volodimirich took Izborsk." It is unknown who exactly led the Izborsk campaign; although the LRC associates the operation with Hermann Balk, he had already fled to Germany in 1238 and died in March 1239/1240. He was succeeded by Dietrich von Grüningen and Andreas von Felben, but whether they personally participated in the campaign against Izborsk and Pskov, or the later battle of Lake Peipus, is unknown. The army was allied with Yaroslav Vladimirovich of Pskov, son of the former prince of Pskov, who was in exile amongst the Livonians. The campaign intended to secure Pskov for Yaroslav and the Catholic Church and their first target was the Pskovian fortress of Izborsk.

=== Capture of Izborsk ===
The Livonian army with Yaroslav's troops took the fortress. The Livonian Rhymed Chronicle relates the capture thus:

(LRC original text)
die brûdere er zû hulfe bat der meister quam in ûf der stat und brâcht im manchen rischen helt beide kûne und ûʒ irwelt. des kuniges man quâmen dar mit einer hovelîchen schar;	des was bischof Herman vrô. mit deme here sie kârten dô vrôlîchen in der Rûʒen lant. eʒ gienc in dâ vil vol in hant. vor eine burg sie quâmen dô, die was irre kumft unvrô.	sturmes man mit in began, daʒ hûs gewunnen sie in an. Îsburc die burc hieʒ. der Rûʒen kan keinen lieʒ, man brêchte in in nôt. welcher sich zû were bôt,	der wart gevangen oder geslagen. man hôrte rûfen und clagen: in deme lande uber al erhûb sich ein michel schal.

"...he [bishop Hermann of Dorpat] called on the Brothers for help. The Master came to him straightaway with many noble heroes, outstanding and bold, and the king's men also came with a fine force. Bishop Herman was well-pleased. With this army they went happily into the Rus' land [in der Rûʒen lant], and everything went well for them. They came to a castle there, named Isborg [Îsburc], and their arrival dismayed the garrison. They took the castle by storm and let none of the Rus' escape [der Rûʒen kan keinen lieʒ], killing or capturing all those who resisted [welcher sich zû were bôt]. Cries and shouts and a mighty lament arose throughout the land."

— Livonian Rhymed Chronicle, lines 2077–2098

=== Pskovian counter-attack ===
A 600-man force from Pskov continuously tried to recapture the fort, yet was defeated by the Livonian army. The Livonian Rhymed Chronicle recalls the failed Pskovian counter-attack:

(LRC original text)
Die von Plezcowe dô wâren diser mêre unvrô einde stat ist sô genant, die liet in Rûʒen lant. dâ sint lûte harte sûr, die wâren diser nâkebûr.	von den wart nicht gespart, sie hûben sich ûf die vart und jageten grimmelîchen dar mit mancher brunjen lichtvar; ir helme lûchten als ein glas. vil manich schutze dâ mite was.	sie quâmen ûf der brûder her; die satzten sich kein in zû wer. die brûdere und des kuniges man die Rûʒen vrîlîchen riten an. bischof Herman der was dar als ein helt mit sîner schar.	sich hûb ein ungevûger strît: die dûtschen hiwen wunden wît, die Rûʒen liden grôze nôt: man slûc ir achte hundert tôt, die bliben ûf deme wal. bie Îsburc nâmen sie den val.	die andere nâmen dâ die vlucht, man jagete sie âne zucht

"Those from Pskov [Plezcowe] were unhappy about the news [of Izborsk's capture]. This is the name of a neighboring town in Rus' [in Rûʒen lant] whose inhabitants were extremely evil. None of them stayed behind but rather all participated in the expedition and grimly stormed [toward Isborg], with many bright cuirasses and helmets shining like glass. There were many crossbowmen among them. When they came upon the [Livonian] Brothers' army they attacked, and the Brothers and the king's men boldly charged toward them. [Bishop Herman was there as a hero with his army]. A vicious battle arose. The Germans [dûtschen] hacked great wounds and the Rus' [Rûʒen] suffered terribly. Eight hundred of them fell on the battlefield, which was near Isborg [Îsburc]. The others took to flight and were pursued relentlessly...."

— Livonian Rhymed Chronicle, lines 2099–2124

=== Encirclement and surrender of Pskov ===
The Livonian army then marched on Pskov, which was left defenceless. The Livonians camped outside of Pskov for a week, burning villages and Orthodox monasteries, including their books and icons. With a reduced defence and a defeat at Izborsk, the mayor of Pskov, Tverdilo Ivankovich, opened the city gates and surrendered the city to the Livonians and Yaroslav Vladimirovich.

== Aftermath ==
=== New division of powers ===
The political faction in Pskov supporting Aleksandr Yaroslavich was overthrown. Yaroslav Vladimirovich, who may well have been Gêrpolt mentioned in the LRC, as well as Prince Ghereslawus in a 1248 charter, finally seems to have assumed the throne of Pskov of his late father, although his real authority likely remained dependent on mayor Tverdilo Ivankovich, as well as the Bishopric of Dorpat and the Order. They would jointly control Pskov for the next two years until a force of Novgorodians commanded by Aleksandr Yaroslavich recaptured the city in spring 1242.

It is unknown what happened to Yaroslav afterwards; he is last mentioned in historical sources in 1245, and presumably died before 1248. The 1248 charter claims that Prince Ghereslawus had donated his possession of Pskov to the Bishopric of Dorpat, and in 1248, the Bishopric ceded the rights of half the fiefs in the principality of Pskov to the Teutonic Order. Similarly, the LRC narrates that Prince Gêrpolt donated the city and land of Pskov to the Teutonic Order in 1239/1240, (Note: "that Gêrpolt who was their prince / gave with his good will / the castle and the good lands / into the hands of the Teutonic Knights".) and later comments that "many knights and squires / deserved their right to a fief" during the siege of Pskov. Finally, while Yaroslav treated Pskov as a hereditary possession that he could pass on within his family or donate to whom he pleased, the Pskovian citizens sought to either make or keep the prince of Pskov an elective office (similar to the prince of Novgorod in the Novgorod Republic), in service of the people rather than vice versa. It is thus unlikely that the Pskovian veche would have accepted Yaroslav "donating" the Pskov Land to the Bishopric of Dorpat, let alone the cession of half of Pskov to the Teutonic Order in 1248. This suggests a complex division of powers and interests after the allies thus captured Izborsk and Pskov from the forces aligned with the Suzdalian dynasty, and when they lost it again two years later.

=== Novgorodian recapture ===
Even though some of the pro-Suzdalian Pskovians fled with their wives and children to Novgorod after the Dorpat–Livonian–Vladimirovich capture of Pskov in late 1240, there was no immediate Novgorodian response in its aftermath. In fact, the NPL narrates that the citizens of Novgorod drove out Aleksandr of Suzdal as well: "In the winter in the same year Knyaz Olexander went out from Novgorod with his mother and his wife and all his court, to his father in Pereyaslavl [=Pereslavl-Zalessky], having quarrelled with the men of Novgorod." Selart concluded that 'no great threat was felt in Novgorod' at the time. Likewise, the Livonian Order seemed comfortable in Pskov, not expecting a Novgorodian counter-attack; the LRC wrote that the Order's army left Pskov at the campaign's end, stationing only "two Brothers and a small force of Germans there to guard the land. This proved disastrous for them and their rule was of short duration." The Chronicon of Hermann von Wartberge confirms that only two Livonian Brothers were tasked to defend Pskov with a small garrison.

In the winter of 1240/1241, troops from the Bishopric of Ösel–Wiek and the Teutonic Order invaded and occupied Votia. After, the Teutonic knights constructed the fortress of Koporye, where they kept all their supplies, and according to the NPL also took the Novgorodian town of Tesov, pillaging its merchants and ravaging the surrounding area. The Novgorodians, fearing a fate similar to that of Pskov, sent envoys to Prince Yaroslav Vsevolodovich of Suzdal. Yaroslav initially sent Aleksandr's younger brother Andrey Yaroslavich as a knyaz, but Novgorod insisted on Aleksandr. Aleksandr returned to Novgorod and commanded a coalition of Novgorodians, Ladogans, Karelians and Ingrians to capture the fortress Koporye in spring 1241. In March 1242, Novgorodians led by Aleksandr and his brother Andrey recaptured Pskov. After this victory, Aleksandr decided to continue his campaign into "the land of the Chud'". This eventually led to the Battle of Lake Peipus (the so-called "battle on the Ice") took place at or on Lake Peipus, in which an allied Novgorodian–Suzdalian force defeated a coalition of the Livonian Order and the Bishopric of Dorpat.

== Interpretation ==
In later centuries, Alexander "Nevsky" Yaroslavich had become venerated as a saint (canonised by Macarius, Metropolitan of Moscow in 1547), and the idea emerged that there was a coordinated attempt by crusaders to subjugate and convert all Rus'. Estonian historian Anti Selart has pointed out that the papal bulls from 1240 to 1243 do not mention warfare against "Rus'" (or "Russians"), but against non-Christians. Selart also argues that the crusades were not an attempt to conquer Rus', but still constituted an attack on the territory of Novgorod and its interests. The two opposing alliances included Catholic and Orthodox powers on both sides. Lake Peipus 'did become the dividing line between Catholic and Orthodox worlds, but the place given to the Battle of the Ice as a significant event in world history is based purely on ideological concerns rather than historical evidence.'

== Bibliography ==
=== Primary sources ===
- Nicolaus of Dargun (3 October 1248), Charter between the Bishopric of Dorpat and the Teutonic Order. It refers to an alleged agreement (dated c. 1239; no text of it has been preserved) in which Prince Ghereslawus [probably Yaroslav Vladimirovich] would donate his possession of Pskov to the Bishopric of Dorpat upon his death.
- Livonian Rhymed Chronicle (LRC, c. 1290s).
  - Meyer, Leo (1876). Livländische Reimchronik, mit Anmerkungen, Namenverzeichniss und Glossar herausgegeben von Leo Meyer [Livonian Rhymed Chronicle, with Annotations, Index of Names and Glossary, edited by Leo Meyer] (in German). Paderborn. (Reprint: Hildesheim 1963). Verses 2235–2262.
  - Kleinenberg, I. E. (1966). "Старшая Ливонская Рифмованная Хроника" [The Older Livonian Rhymed Chronicle, translated to Russian by I.E. Kleinenberg]. Восточная Литература (Oriental Literature) (in Russian).
  - Smith, Jerry C.; Urban, William L., eds. (1977). The Livonian Rhymed Chronicle: Translated with an Historical Introduction, Maps and Appendices. Uralic and Altaic series. Bloomington: Indiana University Press. p. 181. ISBN 978-0-87750-213-5.
- Synod Scroll (Older Redaction) of the Novgorod First Chronicle (NPL, c. 1315).
  - Michell, Robert; Forbes, Nevill (1914). The Chronicle of Novgorod 1016–1471. Translated from the Russian by Robert Michell and Nevill Forbes, Ph.D. Reader in Russian in the University of Oxford, with an introduction by C. Raymond Beazley and A. A. Shakhmatov (PDF). London: Gray's Inn. p. 237.
- Life of Alexander Nevsky (c. 1450).

=== Literature ===
- Basilevsky, Alexander Mykolayovych (2016). Early Ukraine: a military and social history to the mid-19th century. Jefferson, North Carolina: McFarland & Company, Inc., Publishers. p. 408. ISBN 978-1-4766-2022-0.
- Fonnesberg-Schmidt, Iben (2007). The popes and the Baltic crusades, 1147–1254. Brill. ISBN 9789004155022.
- Mänd, Anu; Tamm, Marek (2020). Making Livonia: Actors and Networks in the Medieval and Early Modern Baltic Sea Region. Routledge. p. 364. ISBN 978-1-000-07693-6.
- Martin, Janet (2007). Medieval Russia: 980–1584. Second Edition. E-book. Cambridge: Cambridge University Press. ISBN 978-0-511-36800-4.
- Ostrowski, Donald (2006). "Alexander Nevskii's 'Battle on the Ice': The Creation of a Legend". Russian History/Histoire Russe. 33 (2/4). Brill: 289–312. doi:10.1163/187633106X00186. ISSN 0094-288X. JSTOR 24664446.
- Selart, Anti (2001). "Confessional Conflict and Political Co-operation: Livonia and Russia in the Thirteenth Century". Crusade and Conversion on the Baltic Frontier 1150–1500. Routledge. pp. 151–176. doi:10.4324/9781315258805-8. ISBN 978-1-315-25880-5.
- Selart, Anti (2015). "Chapter 3: Livonia and Rus' in the 1230s and 1240s". Livonia, Rus' and the Baltic Crusades in the Thirteenth Century. Leiden/Boston: BRILL. pp. 127–170. doi:10.1163/9789004284753_005. ISBN 978-90-04-28475-3.
  - Conedera, Sam (2012). "Review: Livonia, Rus' and the Baltic Crusades in the Thirteenth Century (East Central and Eastern Europe in the Middle Ages, 450–1450, 29) by Anti Selart". Archivum Historiae Pontificiae. 50. Gregorian Biblical Press: 221–224. ISSN 0066-6785. JSTOR 44627101.
