= 1240–1241 Votia campaign =

Military campaign in Votia (modern-day Leningrad Oblast)

Date	Winter 1240/41 – late 1241
Location	Votia (in the western parts of present-day Leningrad Oblast, bordering on Estonia)
Result	Novgorodian victory

Belligerents
Teutonic Order; Livonian Order; Bishopric of Ösel–Wiek; Local Votian leaders	Civilians in Votia; Civilians in Tesovo and Luga; Novgorod Republic

Commanders and leaders
Henry of Ösel	Alexander Nevsky (late 1241)

The 1240–1241 Votia campaign was a military conflict occurring in the winter of 1240 to 1241 in Votia (in the western parts of modern-day Leningrad Oblast). An alliance of the Bishopric of Ösel–Wiek, the Livonian Order (the former Livonian Brothers of the Sword, which had recently been incorporated into the Teutonic Order), as well as Estonians (called Chud' in Rus' sources), marched into Votia, defeating what little resistance it met, likely supported by several local Votian leaders, and establishing a fortress at Koporye.

Surviving sources suggest the invading coalition, particularly bishop Henry of Ösel, was primarily interested in converting the local Finnic peoples from their forms of paganism to Christianity, as well as acquiring more territory to be divided amongst the Livonian gentry (the former Sword Brothers). Possibly, some knights with nominal fealty to king Valdemar II of Denmark (died March 1241) participated as well. Reportedly, they also plundered the countryside, attacking merchants and possibly the Novgorodian town of Luga, which caused a Novgorodian force under the Suzdalian prince Aleksandr "Nevsky" Yaroslavich to launch an assault on Koporye later in 1241, ousting the allies, and compelling them to withdraw to Livonia in 1242.

== Background ==
In 1227, the Livonian Brothers of the Sword took advantage of Denmark's weakened state and seized control of the Duchy of Estonia. King Valdemar II of Denmark attempted to recover the duchy by appealing to the Roman Curia. However, the Curia's response was greatly delayed, and it was not until February 1236 that Pope Gregory IX finally decided in favour of Denmark. However, the Brothers of the Sword refused to comply, until the Brothers were themselves weakened by the Battle of Saule in 1236. They were compelled to merge with the Teutonic Order and subsequently became the Livonian Order. The Treaty of Stensby in 1238 returned all of Estonia to Denmark, with the exception of Järva. Additionally, the king of Denmark would receive two-thirds of all future lands conquered from pagans in the region, while the Brothers would receive one-third.

By 1240, Denmark under Valdemar II, Sweden under Birger Jarl, as well as the Livonian Order, were resolved to initiate a crusade against Votia and Novgorod. According to Russian sources only, the Novgorodians defeated a Swedish fleet in the Battle of the Neva in the summer of 1240.

== Votia campaign ==
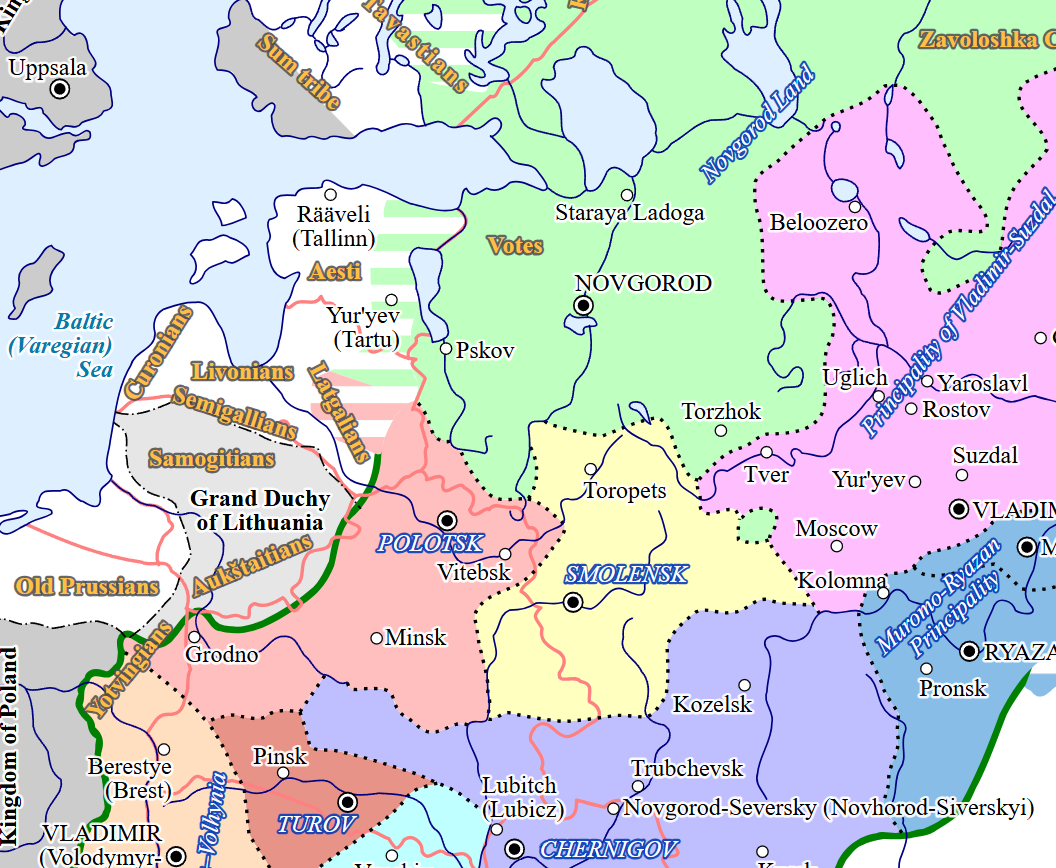
Situation in 1237: Livonia (various factions) Lithuania (pagan) Novgorod Republic (with Pskov) Suzdalia (Yurievichi clan) Smolensk (Rostislavichi clan) Chernigov (Olgovichi clan)

A force consisting of Germans and Estonians invaded Votia in the winter of 1240–1241. They occupied the city of Koporye and built a stone castle in order to secure the territory.

Further to the south, the villages of Tesov and Sablia were also captured, which only lay 30 versts (roughly 30 km) from Veliky Novgorod. It is reported in the Novgorod First Chronicle (NPL) that the Votians suffered greatly from the campaign.

The primary motive seems to have been that the Livonian Order regarded Votia as a pagan territory to be conquered and converted, unlike Novgorod, which they appeared to have no military or religious designs against. Nevertheless, the move was probably also done in order to cut off Novgorodian access to the southern side of the Gulf of Finland, which would severely impact its foreign trade. The 1241 treaty between bishop Henry of Ösel-Wiek and the Teutonic Order established legal and economic regulations in the newly acquired area, and mentions that campaign participants were given fiefdoms and other benefits in Votia.

According to Fonnesberg-Schmidt (2007), "Votia, the lands north-east of Lake Peipus" (...) "were tributary to Novgorod". On the other hand, Selart (2015) stated that "it is not clear how secure Novgorod's control was in Votia at the time (...) There are a number of references to Votia's dependence on Novgorod from the second half of the 13th century. It is nevertheless unknown how much of Votia fell within this dependency c. 1240."

There is no indication that Denmark was involved with this campaign. (Note: "The Votia campaign is consistent with the continual conquest of pagan lands provided for in the Treaty of Stensby. Commercial considerations may also have played a part in this respect. According to the Treaty of Stensby, however, Denmark too should have taken part in these events, yet there is no evidence of this in the sources.") Moreover, on 28 March 1241, king Valdemar II died, causing a succession crisis in Denmark between his sons Eric and Abel over the question of who should succeed Valdemar. This situation made it impossible for the Danes to launch any kind of crusade in Estonia, let alone beyond Estonia. (Note: By 1244, Eric and Abel had reconciled and marched as far as Ystad, only to abandon the crusade before it had even seen battle, possibly due to ongoing conflict between the two royal brothers.) In theory, it is possible that some nominal vassals of Valdemar II took part in the Votia campaign, such as Dietrich von Kivel and Otto von Lüneburg, as they appeared to have interests around Koporye later, perhaps stemming from enfeoffments made to campaign participants during the brief takeover of Votia; but those would have been conducted under the authority of the Bishopric of Ösel–Wiek and the Teutonic Order, not the Danish king.

In late 1241, Aleksandr Yaroslavich of Suzdal returned to Novgorod, leading an army into Votia that defeated the Livonian troops, taking some captive while releasing others. The NPL tells that Aleksandr supposedly hanged "the Votian and Chud' traitors". The following year, 1242, the NPL narrates that "German" envoys travelled to Novgorod (when Aleksandr was absent), agreeing to withdraw from "the land of the Vod people, of Luga, Pleskov, and Lotygola".

== Aftermath ==
Historian Alexander Basilevsky claimed that it had become clear to Novgorod, that the Crusaders, besides trade, were also interested in conquering new territories. As a response to the fall of Pskov, Alexander Nevsky reassumed power. The newly arrived prince took the Novgorodian city militia and set out for the occupied Votians, and retook the Livonian castle of Koporye. Danish and German prisoners from the fortress were sent to Novgorod. Nevsky, along with his brother, Prince Andrey of Suzdal, appeared outside of the Crusader-occupied Pskov and quickly stormed the city. The Novgorodians crossed the Velikaya and began burning and pillaging Livonian territory. In response, the Livonian coalition raised an army in Livonia and Estonia, under Hermann von Buxhoevden, and met the Novgorodians at the Battle on the Ice.

== Interpretation ==
It is a matter of scholarly debate what the causes, purposes and effects of the Votia campaign were. According to an older, influential historiographic tradition, the Oeselian–Livonian–Votian alliance should be regarded as part of a wider, co-ordinated effort that deliberately sought to attack and conquer the Novgorod Republic and the rest of Kievan Rus' in order to convert its population from Eastern Orthodoxy to Catholicism. This tradition emerged from a local cult of veneration in Vladimir at the end of the 13th century, which centred on the role of Aleksandr Yaroslavich in the Novgorodian conflicts of the early 1240s. By the 15th century, Aleksandr was given the sobriquet "Nevsky" in reference to the supposed Neva battle, and by the 16th century, he was regarded as a heroic defender of Rus', as well as the Orthodox faith, and the progenitor of the Daniilovichi clan of Muscovy.

In 1928 and 1929, Finnish historians Jalmari Jaakkola and especially Gustav Donner expanded on this Nevskian hagiographic tradition by promoting the theory of co-ordination between various "Catholic" countries and military orders, organised by papal legate William of Modena, of having a well-prepared plan to conquer and convert all of Rus' to Catholicism in the 1230s and 1240s. In this vision, the 1240–1241 Votia campaign was only a small part of grand crusade against Orthodox "Russia", closely linked to the alleged Swedish July 1240 Neva campaign, the Dorpat–Livonian–Vladimirovich September 1240 Izborsk and Pskov campaign and the subsequent the April 1242 Battle of Lake Peipus (which Nevskian tradition had transformed into the so-called "Battle on the Ice"). Donner and Jaakkola argued the fact that these campaigns all occurred around the same time, and especially that Aleksandr Yaroslavich participated in all three, could not be a coincidence; therefore, all three events were linked together. Most Russian historians, as well as several western European historians, adopted Donner's theory of co-ordination.

By the late 20th century, Donner's theory of co-ordination was increasingly questioned by modern scholars, pointing out that 'there are only indirect arguments in favour of treating the three campaigns as a single interrelated war', 'nor does there seem to have been a papal 'master-plan' for a joint campaign against the Orthodox Russians.' Historians such as John Fennell (1983) and Evgeniya Nazarova (2001) concluded that if the Neva battle happened, it should be regarded as part of the Swedish–Novgorodian Wars for control of Finland and Karelia, rather than that the Swedes collaborated with the Danes and Germans in Livonia. Papal documents and treaties of the time only speak of conquering pagan lands and converting pagans to Catholicism.

Anti Selart (2001, 2015) and many other historians have argued that if the Votia campaign could be called a "crusade", as the older historiographic tradition would have it, it was merely 'a continuation of the process of Christianization already under way in Estonia. Its aim was to conquer the pagan territories and obtain rule over them by means of baptism. The campaign against Novgorod was launched because of the ties between Votia and Novgorod, but the crusade was not explicitly aimed against Christian Rus.' If the Votian campaign merely sought to acquire and Christianise pagan lands, this might have unintentionally provoked a Novgorodian reaction that the crusading coalition did not expect. The Livonian conquest of Votia might also have seriously harmed Novgorod's commercial interests by taking control of one of its nearby waterways, but whether that was one of its purposes, or consequences, is uncertain. Finally, Iben Fonnesberg-Schmidt (2007) concluded that "the campaign against Izborsk and Pskov was a purely political undertaking which had nothing to do with conversion of pagans."

== See also ==
- Battle of Julin Bridge – 12th century Danish naval and land battle against Pomeranians
- Valdemar II of Denmark – King of Denmark from 1202 to 1241
- Canute, Duke of Estonia – Danish noble, Duke of Estonia
- Battle on the Ice – 1242 battle of the Northern Crusades on the frozen Lake Peipus
- Second Swedish Crusade – 13th century Swedish military expedition to Finland

== Bibliography ==
=== Primary sources ===
- Treaty (13 April 1241) between bishop Henry of Ösel and the Teutonic Order.
- Livonian Rhymed Chronicle (LRC, c. 1290s). Verses 2065–2203.
  - Meyer, Leo (1876). Livländische Reimchronik, mit Anmerkungen, Namenverzeichniss und Glossar herausgegeben von Leo Meyer [Livonian Rhymed Chronicle, with Annotations, Index of Names and Glossary, edited by Leo Meyer] (in German). Paderborn. (Reprint: Hildesheim 1963). Verses 2235–2262.
  - Smith, Jerry C.; Urban, William L., eds. (1977). The Livonian Rhymed Chronicle: Translated with an Historical Introduction, Maps and Appendices. Uralic and Altaic series. Bloomington: Indiana University Press. p. 181. ISBN 978-0-87750-213-5.
- Synod Scroll (Older Redaction) of the Novgorod First Chronicle (NPL, c. 1315).
  - Michell, Robert; Forbes, Nevill (1914). The Chronicle of Novgorod 1016–1471. Translated from the Russian by Robert Michell and Nevill Forbes, Ph.D. Reader in Russian in the University of Oxford, with an introduction by C. Raymond Beazley and A. A. Shakhmatov (PDF). London: Gray's Inn. p. 237.
- Life of Alexander Nevsky (c. 1450).

=== Literature ===
- Fonnesberg-Schmidt, Iben (2007). The Popes and the Baltic Crusades, 1147–1254 (PDF). Brill. p. 304. ISBN 9789004155022.
- Mänd, Anu; Tamm, Marek (2020). Making Livonia: Actors and Networks in the Medieval and Early Modern Baltic Sea Region. Routledge. p. 364. ISBN 978-1-000-07693-6.
- Martin, Janet (2007). Medieval Russia: 980–1584. Second Edition. E-book. Cambridge: Cambridge University Press. ISBN 978-0-511-36800-4.
- Selart, Anti (2015). "Chapter 3: Livonia and Rus' in the 1230s and 1240s". Livonia, Rus' and the Baltic Crusades in the Thirteenth Century. Leiden/Boston: Brill. pp. 127–170. doi:10.1163/9789004284753_005. ISBN 978-90-04-28475-3.
