= Nevsky =

Nevsky (masculine), Nevskaya (feminine), or Nevskoye (neuter) may refer to:

== People ==
- Alexander Nevsky (1220–1263), Russian historical icon and patron saint of Saint Petersburg
- Alex Nevsky (musician) (born 1986), French-Canadian singer
- Nikolai Aleksandrovich Nevsky (1892–1937), Russian linguist, executed and later rehabilitated by the Soviet Union
- Olga Nevskaya, second wife of Savik Shuster, Ukrainian journalist
- Vladimir Nevsky, Bolshevik activist
- Dina Nevskaya, fictional character played by Tara Reid in the 2005 movie Silent Partner

== Places ==
- Alexander Nevsky Bridge in Saint Petersburg
- Alexander Nevsky Cathedrals, list of cathedrals and churches named after Alexander Nevsky
- Alexander Nevsky Lavra or Monastery, founded by Peter the Great in 1710 in Saint Petersburg
- Gora Nevskaya, highest point of the Kolyma Mountains, Magadan Oblast, Russia
- Nevsky District, district of Saint Petersburg, Russia
- Nevsky Prospekt (Saint Petersburg Metro), station on the Moskovsko-Petrogradskaya Line of the Saint Petersburg Metro
- Nevsky Pyatachok, the name of the Neva Bridgehead southeast Saint Petersburg
- Nevskoye Microdistrict, a part of Kaliningrad, Russia

== In arts and entertainment ==
- Alexander Nevsky (film), a 1938 historical drama based on the life of Alexander Nevsky
- Alexander Nevsky (Prokofiev), the score for the 1938 film and a cantata derived from the score, composed by Sergei Prokofiev
- Life of Alexander Nevsky, a Russian literary monument of the late 13th – early 14th centuries
- Life of Alexander Nevsky (illuminated manuscript), a Russian illuminated manuscript of the late 16th century
- Nevsky Prospekt (story), a short story by Nikolai Gogol, published in 1835
- Nevsky String Quartet, based in Saint Petersburg

== Other uses ==
- Order of Saint Alexander Nevsky, first instituted in 1725 by Catherine I of Russia
- Order of Alexander Nevsky, established by the Soviet Union to replace the Order of Saint Alexander Nevsky
- Russian frigate Alexander Nevsky, a large screw frigate of the Russian Imperial Navy
- Russian submarine Alexander Nevsky, a Russian nuclear submarine of the fourth-generation Borei class

== See also ==
- Aleksandr Nevskiy (athlete) (born 1958), Russian decathlete
