= Parbus =

13th-century Lithuanian noble

Parbus or Parnušis (German: Parnus; Latin: Parbsen, Parbusse) was a 13th-century Lithuanian duke during the reign of King Mindaugas as well as his close advisor, being part of the king's advisory council. A vassal in the historical land of Neris, Parbus acted as the first known high-ranking Lithuanian diplomat, representing Mindaugas in Riga after the latter was baptised in 1251. Parbus later travelled to Pope Innocent IV to relay the message of the baptising. Parbus is mentioned as a clever pagan man in the Livonian Rhymed Chronicle. In 1253 he participated in the crowning of Mindaugas (another person also named Parbus, who was possibly Parbus's son, also participated in the coronation).

== See also ==
- History of Lithuania
