= Nikolai Anderson =

Baltic German philologist (1845–1905)

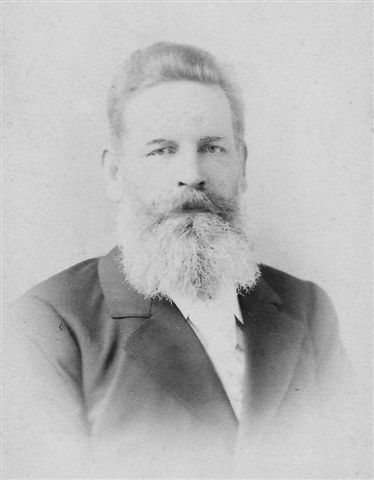
- Nikolai Anderson around 1880
- Born: Nikolai Karl Adolf Anderson; 6 October [O.S. 24 September] 1845; Kulina, Governorate of Estonia, Russian Empire
- Died: 22 March [O.S. 9 March] 1905 (aged 59); Narva, Saint Petersburg Governorate, Russian Empire
- Resting place: Yamburg
- Education: Imperial University of Dorpat
- Spouse: Adele Vogt
- Awards: Order of St. Anna, 3rd and 2nd class, Order of Saint Stanislaus, 2nd class, Order of Saint Vladimir, 4th class
- Scientific career
- Fields: Finno-Ugric languages
- Workplaces: University of Kazan
- Thesis: Studien zur Vergleichung der ugrofinnischen und indogermanischen Sprachen (1879)
- Academic advisors: Leo Meyer

Nikolai Karl Adolf Anderson (6 October [O.S. 24 September] 1845 – 22 March [O.S. 9 March] 1905) was a Baltic German philologist who lived in the Russian Empire. He specialized in comparative linguistics of Finno-Ugric languages.

== Life ==
Anderson was born in the village of Kulina, Estonia, close to the town of Wesenberg. After receiving a private education in Saint Petersburg he attended the Gouvernements-Gymnasium (Grammar School of the Governorate) in Reval and in 1865 he enrolled in the Imperial University of Dorpat to study philology, where he was a student of Leo Meyer who in the same year had been appointed as the university's professor of Germanistics and Comparative philology. While at university he became interested in Finno-Ugric languages and quickly became an expert in the field.

In 1871 Anderson worked as an hourly paid teacher at the Gymnasium in Dorpat before taking up a post as teacher for classical languages at the Gymnasium in Minsk (now in Belarus) in 1872, but he continued his studies of Finno-Ugric languages in his spare time. In 1874, he got married and soon started a family. Nikolai Anderson's three sons were Wilhelm Anderson (born 1880), Walter Anderson (born 1885), and Oskar Anderson (born 1887), who all went on to choose academic careers.

In 1876 Anderson submitted the results of his research, comparing Finno-Ugric and Indo-Germanic languages to the University of Tartu, for which he was awarded a degree in Comparative philology. Still working as a teacher in Minsk, he continued his research, and in 1891 he gained a Magister degree in Comparative Linguistics. In 1892 his mentor Leo Meyer nominated Anderson for an honorary membership of the Learned Estonian Society (Gelehrte Estnische Gesellschaft), a corresponding member of which he had been since 1871, which was granted to Anderson in the same year.

In January 1894 Anderson was offered a professorship in Finno-Ugric languages at the University of Kazan (Russia) to replace Mihkel Veske, which he accepted, as this allowed him to take up an academic career that would allow him more time for his research. As a professor he had the rank of Статский советник (State Councillor), meaning that he held personal nobility in the Imperial Russian hierarchy.

In 1898 Anderson fell ill with a nervous disorder and was hospitalized for several months in Tartu. In 1904 he relapsed and was once again hospitalized. After his condition improved in early 1905 he visited his sister in Narva, where he fell ill with pleurisy and died shortly thereafter. Anderson was buried with his parents in Yamburg.

== Works ==
In his work, Anderson not only compared different Finno-Ugric languages but also argued for a genetic relationship between Finno-Ugric and Indo-Germanic languages, making him one of the first scholars to investigate possible links between these two language families. At the time of his death, Anderson was the only professor for Finno-Ugric languages in the Russian Empire.

- Anderson, Nikolai (1876), Probe einer vergleichenden Grammatik der ugrofinnischen und indogermanischen Sprachen
- Anderson, Nikolai (1891) [1879], Studien zur Vergleichung der ugrofinnischen und indogermanischen Sprachen (Thesis), H. Laakmann (Dorpat), hdl:10062/5758
- Anderson, Nikolai (1893), Wandlungen der anlautenden dentalen Spirans im Ostjakischen, Mémoires de l'Académie impériale des sciences de St.-Pétersbourg, Imperial Academy of Sciences (St. Petersburg)

== Honours and awards ==
- Imperial Russian Order of St. Anna, 3rd class (awarded 1877)
- Imperial Russian Order of Saint Stanislaus, 2nd class (awarded 1885)
- Imperial Russian Order of St. Anna, 2nd class (awarded 1889)
- Imperial Russian Order of Saint Vladimir, 4th class (awarded 1904)
