= Kulina, Estonia =

Village in Estonia

Coordinates: 59°12′N 26°34′E

Kulina
- Village
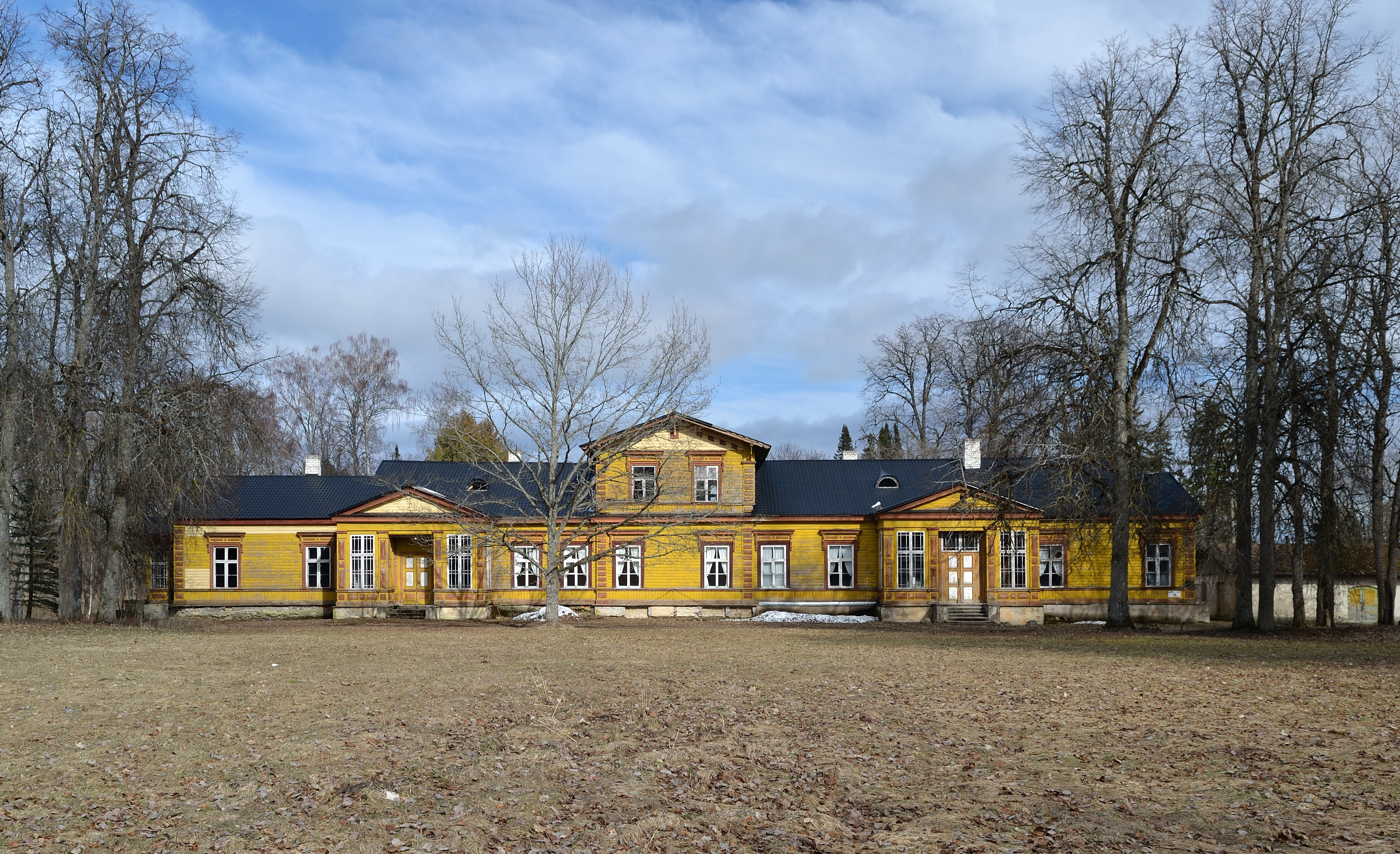
- Kulina Manor house
- Interactive map of Kulina
- Country: Estonia
- County: Lääne-Viru County
- Parish: Vinni Parish
- Time zone: UTC+2 (EET)
  - Summer (DST): UTC+3 (EEST)

Kulina is a village in Vinni Parish, Lääne-Viru County, in northeastern Estonia.

Philologist Nikolai Anderson (1845–1905) was born in Kulina.
