= Life of Alexander Nevsky (illuminated manuscript) =

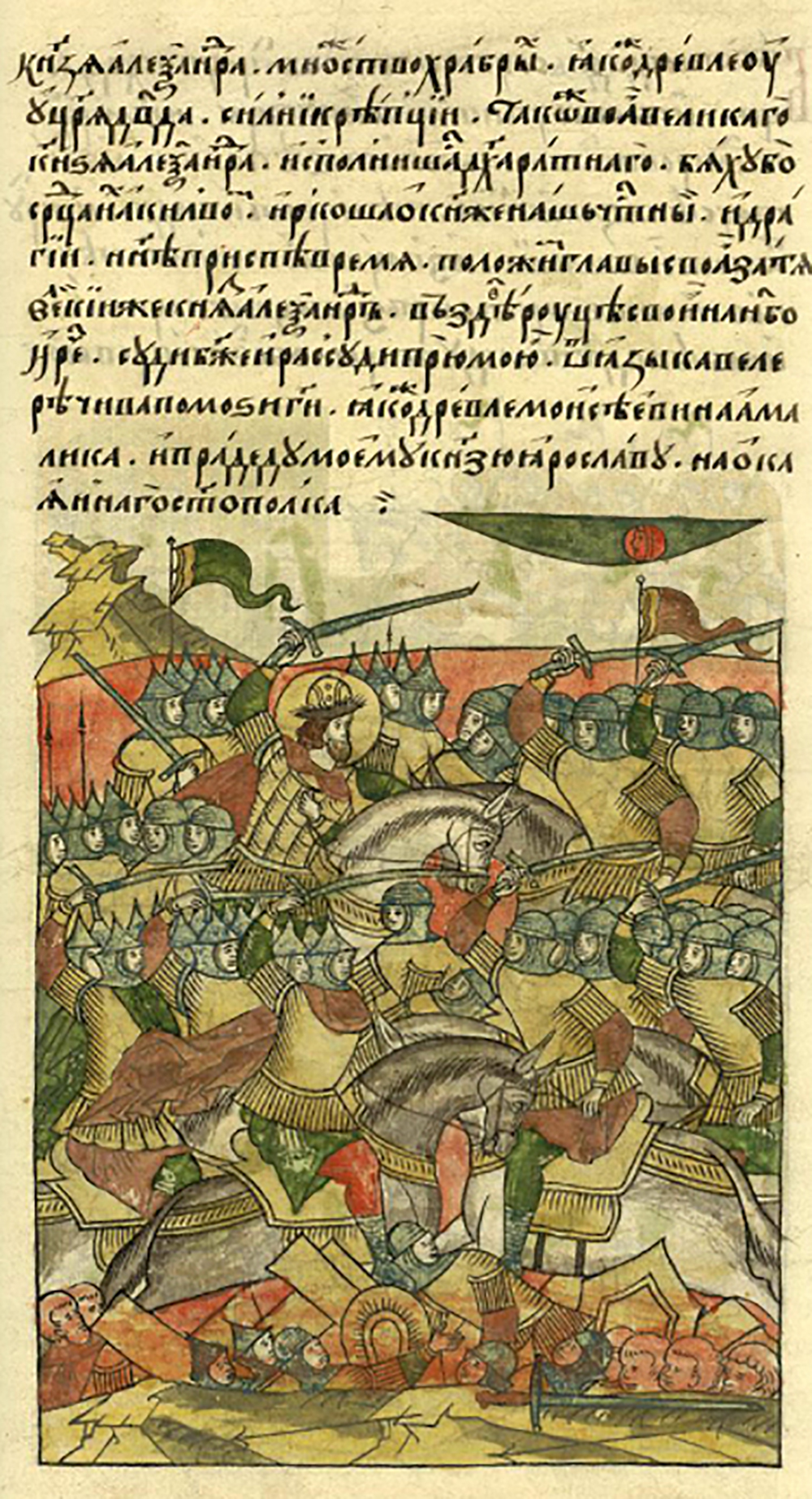
Illustration of the Battle of the Ice (л. 938.).

Life of Alexander Nevsky (Russian: Житие Александра Невского; Zhitiye Aleksandra Nevskogo) is a Russian illuminated manuscript of the 1560s, as part of the Laptev Volume of the Illustrated Chronicle of Ivan the Terrible ("Tsar-Book"). It is currently housed in the National Library of Russia in Saint Petersburg, Russia (manuscript ID: РНБ F.IV.233).

The work includes 83 illuminations and text that describe the life and achievements of Alexander Nevsky, a Russian ruler and a military leader, who defended the northern borders of Rus against the Swedish invasion, defeated the Teutonic knights at the Lake Chud in 1242 and paid a few visits to Batu Khan to protect the Vladimir-Suzdal Principality from the Khazar raids.

== See also ==
- Life of Alexander Nevsky (an earlier text from the 13th-14th century)
- List of illuminated manuscripts
