= Hermann von Wartberge =

Chronicler of Livonia

Hermann von Wartberge (died ca. 1380) was a chronicler of the Livonian Order. Born in Westphalia, Wartberge was a Catholic priest and author of the valuable Latin chronicle Chronicon Livoniale covering the history of the Livonian Crusade from 1196 to 1378. Wartberge used previous chronicles (Livonian Rhymed Chronicle and Chronicle of Henry of Livonia), archival documents, and personal experiences. As the narrative became more detailed around 1358, it is believed that Wartberge joined the Order around the time and began describing the events as an eyewitness. For example, in 1366 he was sent on a diplomatic mission to Gdańsk (Danzig) and took part in numerous military campaigns against the pagan Grand Duchy of Lithuania. Wartberge provided extensive details on localities of the frequent raids and on construction of Livonian fortresses. The chronicle was preserved in the State Archives in Gdańsk and was first published in 1863 by Ernst Strehlke in Scriptores Rerum Prussicarum. Translations into Lithuanian and Latvian were published in 1991 and 2005.

== Bibliography ==
- Anti Selart, Die livländische Chronik des Hermann von Wartberge, in: Matthias Thumser (Hg.), Geschichtsschreibung im mittelalterlichen Livland, Berlin 2011, S. 59-86.
