= Church of Saint Mary of the Germans =

Coordinates: 31.7756°N 35.2330°E

- כנסיית מרים של הגרמנים
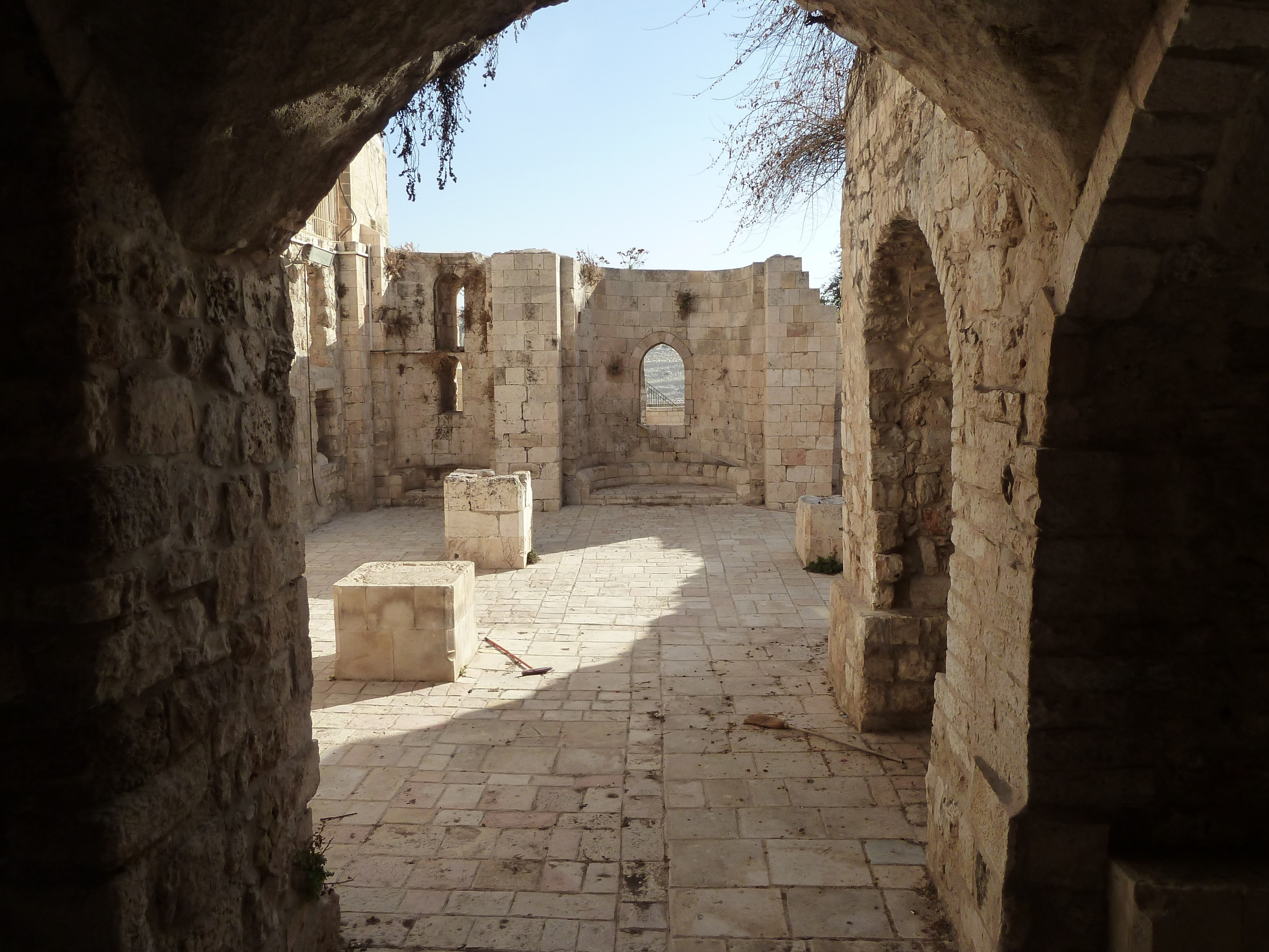
- Church of Saint Mary of the Germans
- Location: East Jerusalem
- Country: Palestine
- Denomination: Roman Catholic Church
- Sui iuris church: Latin Church

History
- Status: Ruin, stabilised

Architecture
- Functional status: Closed

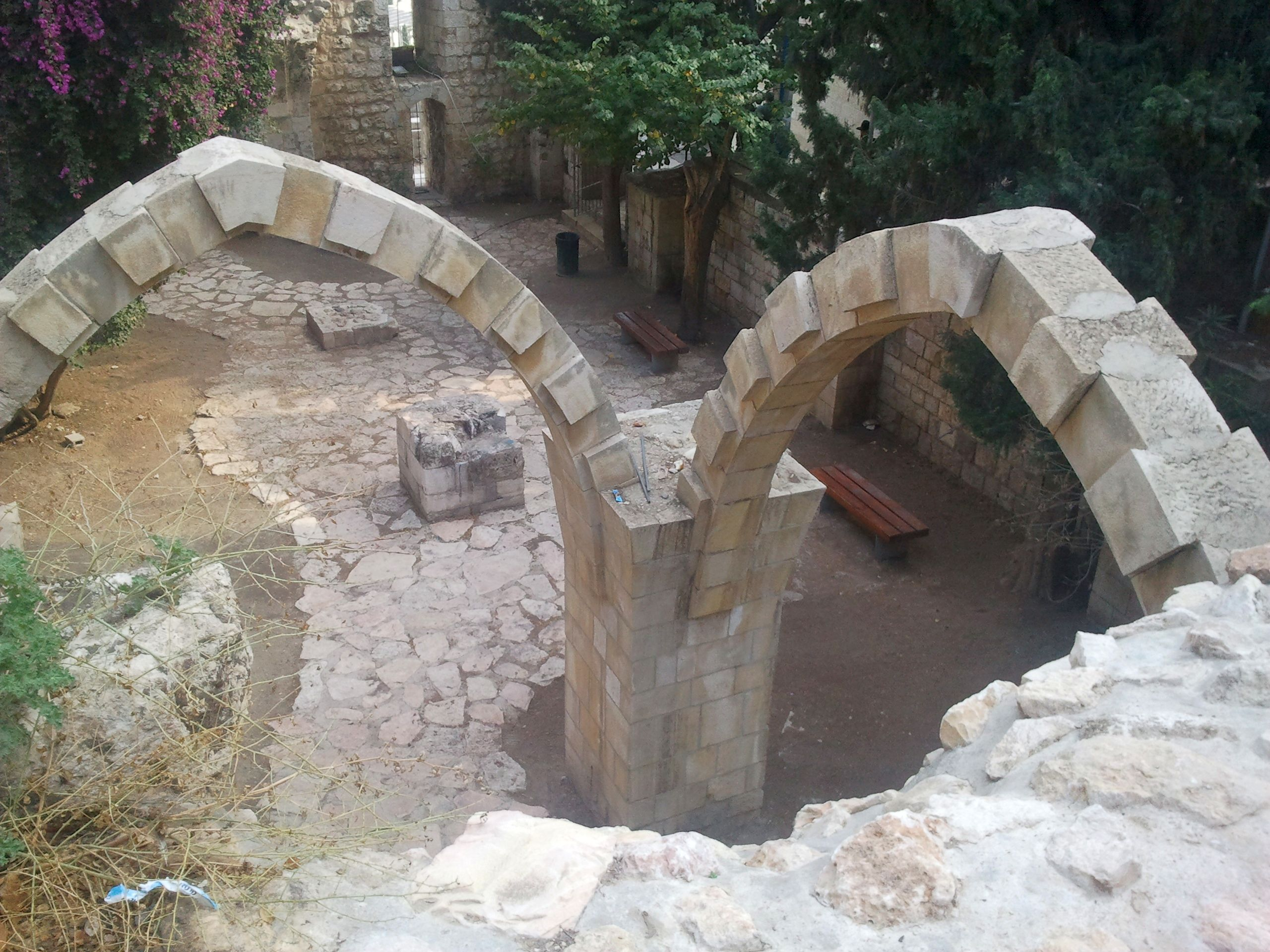
The hospice

The Church of Saint Mary of the Germans (Hebrew: כנסיית מרים של הגרמנים; Latin: Sancta Maria Alemannorum or Sancta Maria Alemanna) was a Catholic church, built in Romanesque style, now in ruins, located in the Old City of Jerusalem on the northeast slope of Mount Zion.

It was in 1126, after the First Crusade, when a German pilgrim and his wife, whose names are unknown, founded a hospice for pilgrims from the Holy Roman Empire. He joined the Hospice of St. John of Jerusalem. Celestine II sets the rules in 1143, taking the hospital under his protection, but with a right of prior review of the Order of St. John. The building was partly destroyed by the attacks of 1187, and rebuilt in 1229. Frederick II assigned it to the Teutonic Knights in April 1229, but then it went to the Order of St. John by order of Pope Gregory IX. As a result of the capture of Jerusalem in 1244, the hospice and church were left in ruins.

The ruins were discovered in 1872 by T. Drake. They are now partially open as part of a public archaeological park.

== See also ==
- Catholic Church in Israel
- Catholic Church in Palestine
- St. Mary's Church (disambiguation)
