= Leo Meyer (philologist) =

German philologist

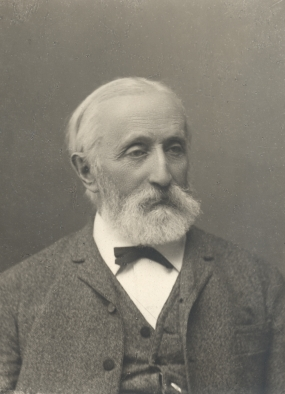
- Photograph c. 1895
- Born: July 3, 1830; Bledeln, Amt Hildesheim, Labddrostei Hildesheim, Kingdom of Hanover, German Confederation
- Died: 6 June 1910 (aged 79); Göttingen, Province of Hanover, Kingdom of Prussia, German Empire

Academic work
- Institutions: University of Göttingen, Imperial University of Dorpat
- Notable students: Nikolai Anderson

Leo Karl Heinrich Meyer (3 July 1830 – 6 June 1910) was a German philologist who spent much of his career in the Governorate of Livonia (now Estonia).

== Biography ==
He was born at Bledeln, a village in the present-day district of Hildesheim, near Hanover. He was educated at Göttingen and Berlin, where he was a student of the Brothers Grimm. From 1862 to 1865, he was professor in Göttingen, and in 1865 he became professor of comparative philology at the Imperial University of Dorpat (now Tartu, Estonia). One of his students there was Nikolai Anderson. From 1869 to 1899 he was the president of the Learned Estonian Society. In 1898 he again accepted a chair at Göttingen. He died in Göttingen.

== Writings ==
His contributions to philological literature include:

- Vergleichende Grammatik der griechischen und lateinischen Sprache (Comparative grammar of Greek and Latin; 1861–65)
- Die gothische Sprache (The Gothic tongue; 1869)
- Handbuch der griechischen Etymologie (Handbook of Greek etymology; 1901)

Other writings include:

- Glauben und Wissen (Belief and knowledge; 1876)
- Ueber das Leben nach dem Tode (On life after death; 1882)

== References / Further reading ==
- Schlüter, Wolfgang (1911), "Nekrolog: Prof. Dr. Leo Meyer (Obituary)", Sitzungsberichte der gelehrten estnischen Gesellschaft zu Dorpat 1910, Gelehrte Estnische Gesellschaft (Jurjew-Dorpat), pp. 167–172, hdl:10062/20920
