= Anti Selart =

Estonian historian

Anti Selart (2023)

Anti Selart (born 11 August 1973 in Tallinn) is an Estonian historian.

Selart is a professor of the Middle Ages at the University of Tartu (since 2009). He studies history of medieval Livonia, especially Russo-Livonian relationships. In 2002 he received a PhD in history.

== Publications ==
- (in German) Livland Und Die Rus Im 13. Jahrhundert in Series: "Quellen Und Studien Zur Baltischen Geschichte (Book 21)" 373 pages Bohlau Verlag (March 3, 2007) ISBN 978-3412160067
- (in German) Die livländische Chronik des Hermann von Wartberge, in: Matthias Thumser (Hg.), Geschichtsschreibung im mittelalterlichen Livland, Berlin 2011, S. 59–86. ISBN 978-3-643-11496-9 (Rezension).
