= Life of Alexander Nevsky =

- Russian: Житие Александра Невского
- Language: Old East Slavic and Old Church Slavonic

The Life of Alexander Nevsky (Note: Russian: Житие Александра Невского, romanized: Zhitie Aleksandra Nevskogo; Ukrainian: Житіє Олександра Невського, romanized: Zhytiye Oleksandra Nevs'koho.) is an Old East Slavic hagiography about Alexander Nevsky, composed and edited in stages between the late 13th century and the mid-15th century. In most manuscript copies, its full title is Tale about the Life of the Brave, Blessed, and Great Prince Alexander Nevskii. (Note: Old East Slavic: Повѣсти о житии и о храбрости благовѣрнаго и великаго князя Александра.)

== Contents ==
The Life of Alexander Nevsky describes the life and achievements of Aleksandr Yaroslavich (1220/21–1263), a prince of Novgorod (intermittently between 1236 and 1259) and a grand prince of Vladimir (r. 1252–1263). He is presented as having defended the northwestern borders of Rus against a Swedish invasion in the legendary Battle of the Neva (July 1240, for which he was nicknamed "Nevsky" in the 15th century, long after the Life was written), defeated the Livonian Order at the Battle of Lake Peipus in 1242 and paid a few visits to Batu Khan to protect the Vladimir-Suzdal Principality from the Khazar raids. The work is filled with 'patriotic spirit' and achieves a 'high degree of artistic expressiveness' in its glorification of Alexander's deeds and those of his warriors as heroic.

== Textual criticism ==
=== Manuscripts ===
The "First Edition" or "First Redaction" of the Life of Alexander Nevsky has been preserved in 13 manuscripts, with the oldest extant manuscripts dating from the 14th century, and the youngest to the 17th century. Yurii Begunov published the first list of all known 13 extant manuscripts in 1965. The 1377 Laurentian Codex only contains the Life's beginning, the c. 1486 Synodal manuscript 154 only the beginning and end, while the other 11 manuscripts contain the full text of the "First Edition".

Begunov 1965 list of 13 manuscripts
no.	s.	Manuscript ID	Pages/folia	Dating	Custodian	City
1	Лв	Laurentian Codex (IV, 2) (only contains the beginning)	лл. 168—169 об.	1377	National Library of Russia (ГПБ)	Saint Petersburg
2	Пс	Synodal manuscript collection 154 (only contains the beginning and end)	лл. 156—162 об.	c. 1486	State Historical Museum (ГИМ)	Moscow
3	П	Pskov-Caves Monastery (ф. 449), 60	лл. 245 об.—249	late 15th century	State Archive of Pskov Oblast (ГАПО)	Pskov
4	Л	Р. IV, оп. 24, 26	лл. 472—479 об.	mid-16th century	Pushkin House (ИРЛИ)	Saint Petersburg
5	А	Moscow Theological Academy (ф. 173), 208	лл. 1—9 об.	mid-16th century	Russian State Library (ГБЛ)	Moscow
6	В	Joseph-Volokolamsk Monastery (ф. ИЗ), 523	лл. 174 об. —190	Q3 16th century	Russian State Library (ГБЛ)	Moscow
7	М	Museum collection 1706	лл. 137 об. —152 об.	Q3 16th century	State Historical Museum (ГИМ)	Moscow
8	Ар	Manuscript collection 18	лл. 112—129	Q3 16th century	State Archive of Arkhangelsk Oblast (ГААО)	Arkhangelsk
9	Пг	M. P. Pogodin collection 641	лл. 67 об.—76 об.	Q3 16th century	National Library of Russia (ГПБ)	Saint Petersburg
10	Б	E. V. Barsov collection 1413	лл. 302 об.—319 об.	c. 1600	State Historical Museum (ГИМ)	Moscow
11	Р	Olonets Seminary collection (ф. 212), 15	лл. 649 об.—659	Q2 17th century	Russian State Library (ГБЛ)	Moscow
12	О	A. N. Ovchinnikov collection (ф. 209), 281	лл. 530—542 об.	mid-17th century	Russian State Library (ГБЛ)	Moscow
13	У	A. S. Uvarov collection 279	лл. 346 об.—353	Q3 17th century	State Historical Museum (ГИМ)	Moscow

=== Textual history ===
Historian Vasily Klyuchevsky (1871) was the first to make a distinction between different editions of the Life of Alexander Nevsky, naming the oldest edition the "First Edition" (Russian: Первоначальная редакция, romanized: Pervonachal’naya redaktsiya).

Yurii Begunov (1965), basing himself on thirteen stand-alone manuscripts, dated the first redaction of the Life of Alexander Nevsky to the 1280s, hypothesising that it had been composed in the Rozhdestvensky (Nativity) monastery in Vladimir-on-Kliazma. Begunov reasoned that during this recension, a passage was added mentioning that metropolitan Kirill II of Kiev declared that "the sun has set in the Suzdalian Land" at Nevsky's funeral.

According to scholar Donald Ostrowski (2008), the original text of the Life of Alexander Nevsky was a secular military narrative, written by a layman in the late 13th century, who made no mention of "the Suzdalian Land", nor of "the Rus' Land". Some hagiographic motifs would be inserted by a cleric a century later, but still no reference to "Suzdalian/Rus' Land". Ostrowski argued that the "First Redaction" of the Life should be dated to the mid-15th century, because it used the Novgorod First Chronicle (NPL) Older Redaction as a source, whereas the NPL Younger Redaction incorporated parts of the Life. It would be this editor who added an allusion to Volodimer I of Kiev's conversion of "the Rus' Land", and two mentions of "the Suzdalian Land", one of them the setting sun passage.

=== Authorship ===
In two 1947 papers, Dmitry Likhachev asserted that the author of the Life of Alexander Nevsky had to have been metropolitan Kirill II of Kiev (died c. 1280), who allegedly simultaneously authored the Chronicle of Daniil (corresponding to the 1246–1262 segment of the Galician–Volhynian Chronicle) due to similarities in style. (Note: Likhachev borrowed some arguments from M.D. Priselkov, who in 1940 first asserted that metropolitan Kirill II wrote the whole Galician–Volhynian Chronicle (GVC), because its text mentions a pechatnik (keeper of the seal) named "Kirill".) While this view soon became dominant amongst scholars (including Begunov, Günther Stökl, Norman Ingham, S. A. Zenkovsky, John Fennell, and O. V. Tvogorov) for decades, Mari Isoaho (2006) and Ostrowski (2008) firmly rejected Kirill's authorship, pointing out numerous flaws in Likhachev's reasoning, (Note: Mari Isoaho: "Likhachev's theory is illogical at many points, as it contains numerous obscurities and contradictory ideas. One of the major peculiarities was his assumption that the aim of the Chronicle of Daniil was originally to celebrate the crowning of Daniil as king in 1253. In that case it is highly unlikely that an author who wrote the Chronicle to celebrate the alliance of Daniil and the pope later opposed it so much that he wrote an anti-Catholic pamphlet in the form of the Life of Aleksandr.") (Note: Donald Ostrowski: "It is difficult to see, however, in the version of the quotation that Likhachev cited (...), any evidence of Kirill's writing or commissioning the Life to be written. (...) In addition, the stylistic similarities that Likhachev pointed out between the [Galician Chronicle] and the Life are not compelling evidence of single authorship, but only suggestive of possible familiarity of one work by the author of the other or of other comon [sic] sources." "If we accept the testimony of the Life, then we have to rule out Metropolitan Kirill as the author. The Life states that the author is recounting "what I heard from my father and I am an eyewitness to [while] growing up." (...) Kirill had been metropolitan of Rus' since 1242. Instead, it sounds very much like someone who was no older than 15 or 20 years when Alexander died in 1263.") and internal and external evidence to the contrary.

== Bibliography ==
- Begunov, Yurii K. (1965). Памятник русской литературы XIII века "Слово о погибели русской земли." (Pamyatnik russkoy literatury XIII veka. "Slovo o pogibeli Russkoy zemli") [A Monument of Rus' Literature of the 13th Century. "The Tale of the Destruction of the Rus' Land."] (in Russian). Moscow: Nauka. p. 229.
- Halperin, Charles J. (2022). The Rise and Demise of the Myth of the Rus' Land (PDF). Leeds: Arc Humanities Press. p. 107. ISBN 9781802700565.
- Isoaho, Mari (2006). The Image of Aleksandr Nevskiy in Medieval Russia: Warrior and Saint. Leiden: Brill. p. 428. ISBN 9789047409496. (public version of PhD dissertation).
- Ostrowski, Donald (2008). "Redating the Life of Alexander Nevskii". In Dunning, Chester S.L.; Martin, Russell E.; Rowland, Daniel (eds.). Rude & Barbarous Kingdom Revisited: Essays in Russian History and Culture in Honor of Robert O. Crummey. Bloomington: Slavica Publishers. pp. 23–39.
