= Livonian Rhymed Chronicle =

German-language chronicle about Livonia

- Livländische Reimchronik
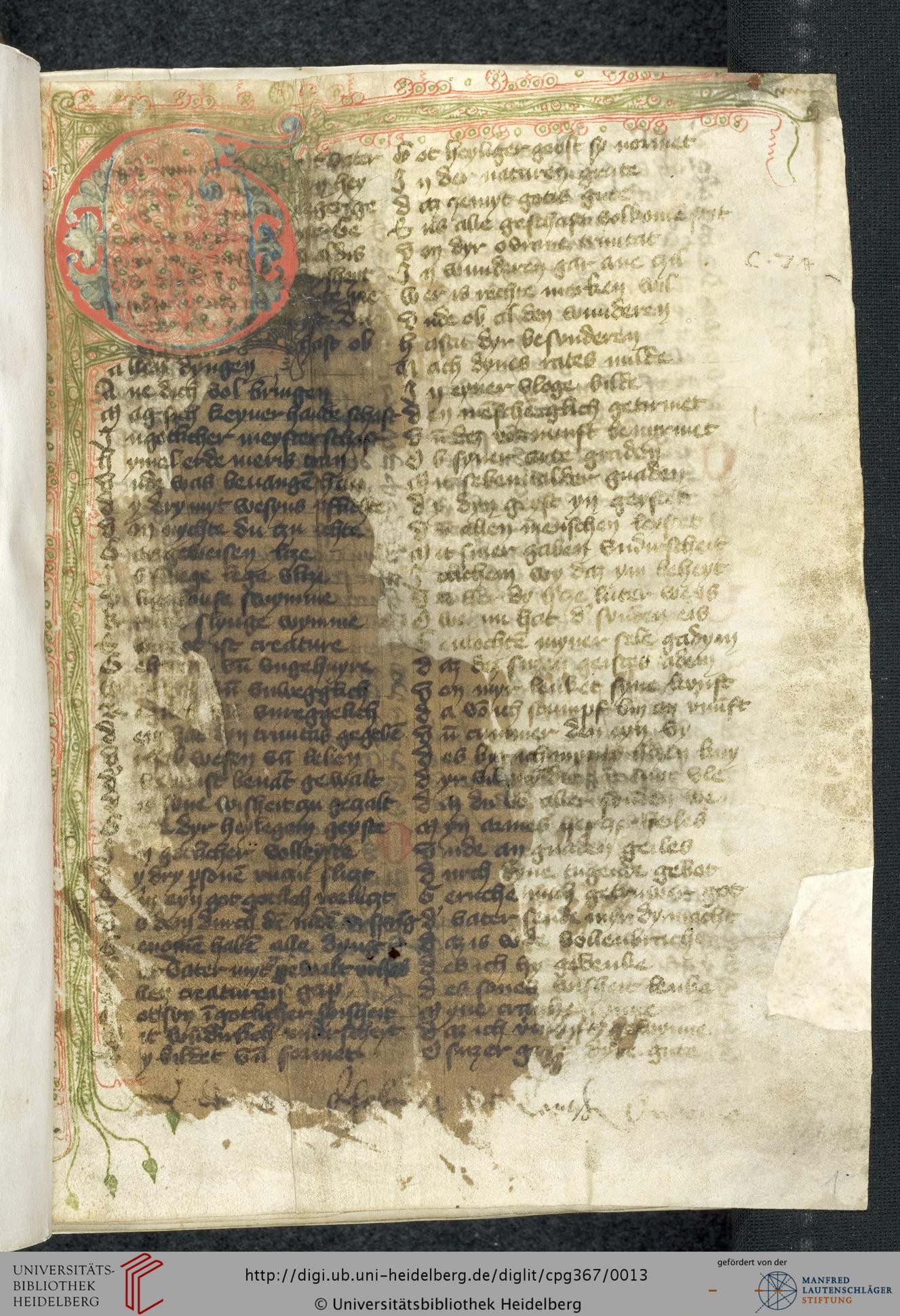
- Page 1r of the Codex Palatinus Germanicus 367, showing the opening lines of the Livonian Rhymed Chronicle
- Author(s): Anonymous
- Audience: Presumed to be the members of the Livonian Order
- Language: Middle High German
- Date: c. 1290s
- Manuscript(s): Codex Palatinus Germanicus 367
- Genre: Chronicle
- Verse form: Rhyming couplets
- Length: 12,017 lines
- Subject: Livonian Crusade
- Period covered: From 1143 to 1290 CE

The Livonian Rhymed Chronicle (German: Livländische Reimchronik) is a chronicle written in Middle High German by an anonymous author. It covers the period 1180 to 1343 and contains a wealth of detail about Livonia (present-day south Estonia and Latvia).

== The Old Chronicle ==
The Rhymed Chronicle is a Middle High German verse history which describes the conquest of the eastern Baltic lands by German crusaders, notably the Livonian Order of the Teutonic Knights, and the Sword Brethren. Its primary function was to inspire the knights and legitimise the northern Crusades. As such, it is infused with elements of romance and exaggerated for the purpose of drama.

The Rhymed Chronicle was previously believed to have been a Tischbuch (a document read to the members of the order during mealtimes). However, it has more recently been suggested that whilst the chronicle would have indeed been read aloud to an audience, this would not have occurred at mealtimes.

Historian Alan V. Murray notes that the Order's own regulations stated that during mealtimes the knights were to be read sections of the Bible or the word of God, and that the Rhymed Chronicle would thus not have qualified as a Tischlesung (mealtime reading). The chronicle is written in High German, whereas the majority of German knights in Livonia at that time would have spoken Low German, and therefore likely would have struggled to understand what was being read to them. Murray suggests that this constraint may have encouraged the author to rely on simplistic language and repetitive structures in order to allow an audience to better understand the history being told in a dialect with which they were not familiar. Murray argues it is likely the document was intended to appeal to the secular crusaders who volunteered for service with the Livonian Brothers of the Sword and Teutonic Order, based on the general brevity of religious themes within the chronicle, and the focus on military expeditions and the order's martial success.

The Rhymed Chronicle narrates the events of the 1242 Battle on the Ice against the Novgorod Republic led by Aleksandr Nevsky:

There is a city in Russia called Novgorod, and when its king [Alexandre] heard what had happened he marched towards Pskov with many troops. He arrived there with a mighty force of many Russians to free the Pskovians and these latter heartily rejoiced. When he saw the Germans he did not hesitate long. They drove away the two Brothers, removed them from their governorship and routed their troops. The Germans fled and allowed the land to revert to the Russians. Thus it went for the Teutonic Knights, but if Pskov had been protected it would have benefited Christianity until the end of the world. It is a mistake to take a fair land and fail to occupy it properly. It is deplorable, for the result is sure to be disastrous. The king of Novgorod then returned home.

== The Younger Chronicle ==
A second rhymed chronicle, known as the Younger Livonian Rhymed Chronicle, was written in Low German by Bartholomäus Hoeneke, chaplain of the Master of the Livonian Order, around the end of the 1340s. It is this chronicle that narrates how Estonians supposedly slaughtered their own nobility and called the Livonian Order to Estonia, which, in turn, butchered them, in 1343. The original is lost, but prose paraphrases survive.

== Editions ==
- Fragment einer Urkunde der ältesten livländischen Geschichte in Versen. Ed. Lib. Bergmann. Riga 1817
- Livländische Reimchronik. Ed. Franz Pfeiffer. Stuttgart 1844 (; Reprint: Amsterdam 1969)
- Livländische Reimchronik. Mit Anmerkungen, Namenverzeichnis und Glossar. Ed. Leo Meyer. Paderborn 1876 (Reprint: Hildesheim 1963)
- Smith, Jerry C.; Urban, William L., eds. (1977). The Livonian Rhymed Chronicle: Translated with an Historical Introduction, Maps and Appendices. Uralic and Altaic series. Bloomington: Indiana University Press. p. 181. ISBN 978-0-87750-213-5.
- Atskaņu hronika. Transl. Valdis Bisenieks, ed. Ēvalds Mugurēvičs. Riga 1998
- Liivimaa vanem riimkroonika. Transl. Urmas Eelmäe. Tallinn 2003
- Cronaca Rimata della Livonia (Livländische Reimchronik). Original parallel Text. Transl. Piero Bugiani, Viterbo 2016.

== See also ==
- Livonian Chronicle of Henry

== Sources ==
- Nicolle, David (15 March 1997). Lake Peipus 1242: Battle of the ice. Bloomsbury USA. ISBN 978-1-85532-553-1.
